= List of mountains in Nepal =

Almost all of Nepal is mountainous and it contains a large section of the Himalayas range peaks, including the highest mountain range in the world. Eight of the fourteen eight-thousanders are located in the country, either in whole or shared across a border with China or India. Nepal has the highest mountain in the world, Mount Everest, at a height of 8,848.86m as well as 1,310 peaks over 6,000 m height. The Nepal government updated its peak profile in 2025, officially recognising 14 mountains surpassing 8,000 metres. It had added 6 new mountain to the list.

== Mountains ==
| Mountain/Peak | metres | feet | Section | Notes | Coordinates |
|---|---|---|---|---|---|
| Mount Everest | 8,848.86 | 29,031.7 | Khumbu Mahalangur | Earth's highest from sea level. Also known as Chomolungma (Tibet) and Sagarmāthā (Nepal) | 27.9881°N 86.925°E |
| Kanchenjunga | 8,586 | 28,169 | Northern Kanchenjunga | 3rd highest on Earth | 27.7030031°N 88.1473531°E |
| Lhotse | 8,516 | 27,940 | Khumbu Mahalangur | 4th highest | 27°57'42"N 86°55'59"E |
| Yalung Kang | 8,505 | 27,904 | Kanchenjunga massif | First ascent 1973 | 27.7052°N 88.1367°E |
| Makalu | 8,485 | 27,838 | Makalu Mahalangur | 5th highest | 27.8892°N 87.0886°E |
| Cho Oyu | 8,188 | 26,864 | Khumbu Mahalangur | 6th highest. 8188m is most recent measurement. | 28.0942°N 86.6608°E |
| Dhaulagiri I | 8,167 | 26,795 | Dhaulagiri | 7th highest | 28.6967°N 83.49°E |
| Manaslu | 8,163 | 26,781 | Mansiri | 8th highest | 28.55°N 84.5597°E |
| Annapurna I | 8,091 | 26,545 | Annapurna | 10th highest | 28.6°N 83.82°E |
| Annapurna I Middle Peak | 8,051 | 26,414 | Annapurna | | 28.6°N 83.83°E |
| Gyachung Kang | 7,952 | 26,089 | Khumbu Mahalangur | Highest 7000er and 15th overall | 28.0981°N 86.7422°E |
| Annapurna II | 7,937 | 26,040 | Annapurna | 16th highest | 28.5381°N 84.135°E |
| Tenzing Peak | 7,916 | 25,971 | Mahalangur | Named for Tenzing Norgay | 28.1°N 86.7°E |
| Himalchuli | 7,893 | 25,896 | Mansiri | 18th highest | 28.4361°N 84.6394°E |
| Ngadi Chuli | 7,871 | 25,823 | Mansiri | 20th highest. First ascent 1970 | 28.5033°N 84.5686°E |
| Nuptse | 7,861 | 25,791 | Everest Group | 319 metres prominence from Lhotse | 27.9664°N 86.89°E |
| Dhaulagiri II | 7,751 | 25,430 | Dhaulagiri | | 28.7633°N 83.3883°E |
| Jannu | 7,711 | 25,299 | Kumbhakarna Kangchenjunga | Aka Kumbhakarna | 27.6667°N 88.0333°E |
| Dhaulagiri IV | 7,661 | 25,135 | Dhaulagiri | | 28.73575°N 83.31478°E |
| Varaha Shikhar | 7,647 | 25,089 | Annapurna | Aka Annapurna Fang. First ascent 1980 | 28.57766°N 83.80131°E |
| Dhaulagiri V | 7,618 | 24,993 | Dhaulagiri | | 28.73402°N 83.36207°E |
| Annapurna III | 7,555 | 24,787 | Annapurna | | 28.5853°N 83.99°E |
| Jongsong Peak | 7,462 | 24,482 | Janak | #57 in the world | 27.8814°N 88.1358°E |
| Gangapurna | 7,455 | 24,459 | Annapurna | | 28.6047°N 83.9642°E |
| Yangra | 7,422 | 24,350 | Ganesh | Aka Ganesh I | 28.3917°N 85.1272°E |
| Kabru | 7,412 | 24,318 | Singalila Kangchenjunga | | 27.635°N 88.1183°E |
| Churen Himal | 7,385 | 24,229 | Dhaulagiri | | 28.731595°N 83.21011°E |
| Kirat Chuli | 7,365 | 24,163 | Kangchenjunga | | 27.7869°N 88.1944°E |
| Nangpai Gosum | 7,350 | 24,110 | Khumbu Mahalangur | First ascent 1986 | 28.0722°N 86.6144°E |
| Gimmigela Chuli | 7,350 | 24,110 | | First ascent 1995 | 27.73°N 88.15°E |
| Chamlang | 7,321 | 24,019 | Barun Mahalangur | #79 in the world | 27.7758°N 86.98°E |
| Dhaulagiri VI | 7,268 | 23,845 | Dhaulagiri | | 28.6967°N 83.49°E |
| Putha Hiunchuli | 7,246 | 23,773 | Dhaulagiri | | 28.7475°N 83.1458°E |
| Langtang Lirung | 7,227 | 23,711 | Langtang | #99 in the world | 28.2561°N 85.5194°E |
| Annapurna Dakshin | 7,219 | 23,684 | Annapurna | Aka Annapurna South | 28.518°N 83.806°E |
| Langtang Ri | 7,205 | 23,638 | Langtang | #106 in the world | 28.4°N 85.7°E |
| Gurja Himal | 7,193 | 23,599 | Dhaulagiri | | 28.67435°N 83.275813°E |
| Chamar | 7,187 | 23,579 | Sringi Himal | First ascent 1953 | 28.5553°N 84.9453°E |
| Nepal Peak | 7,177 | 23,547 | Himalayas | FA 1930 | 27.776802°N 88.182927°E |
| Pumori | 7,161 | 23,494 | Khumbu Mahalangur | First ascent 1962 | 28.0156°N 86.8281°E |
| Nemjung | 7,140 | 23,430 | | First ascent 1983 | 28.735°N 84.4167°E |
| Gaurishankar | 7,134 | 23,406 | Rolwaling | First ascent 1979 | 27.9533°N 86.3358°E |
| Tilicho Peak | 7,134 | 23,406 | Annapurna | First ascent 1979 | 28.6844°N 83.8044°E |
| Api | 7,132 | 23,399 | Yoka Pahar Gurans | First ascent 1960 | 30.0053°N 80.9297°E |
| Baruntse | 7,129 | 23,389 | Barun Mahalangur | First ascent 1954 | 27.88°N 86.98°E |
| Ganesh II | 7,118 | 23,353 | Ganesh Himal | Aka Ganesh NW | 28.3792°N 85.0567°E |
| Pabil | 7,104 | 23,307 | Ganesh | Aka Ganesh III. First ascent 1978 | 28.345833°N 85.08°E |
| Thulagi Chuli | 7,059 | 23,159 | Mansiri | FA 2015 | 28.527476°N 84.520366°E |
| Ratna Chuli | 7,035 | 23,081 | Peri Himal | FA 1996 | 28.8644°N 84.3772°E |
| Machapuchare | 6,993 | 22,943 | Annapurna | Sacred mountain, unclimbed | 28.495°N 83.9492°E |
| Kang Guru | 6,981 | 22,904 | Larkya or Peri | 2005 avalanche kills 18 | 28.6575°N 84.3014°E |
| Loenpo Gang | 6,979 | 22,897 | Jugal Himal | First ascent 1962 | 28.195696°N 85.799466°E |
| Dorje Lhakpa | 6,966 | 22,854 | Langtang | | 28.1739°N 85.7792°E |
| Numbur | 6,958 | 22,828 | Rolwaling | First ascent 1981 | 27.754446°N 86.573074°E |
| Tengi Ragi Tau | 6,938 | 22,762 | Mahalangur | First ascent 2002 | 27.857915°N 86.554091°E |
| Tukuche Peak | 6,920 | 22,700 | Dhaulagiri | First ascent 1969 | 28.74554°N 83.55772°E |
| Shalbachum | 6,918 | 22,697 | Langtang | | |
| Gurkarpo Ri | 6,891 | 22,608 | Jugal Himal | First ascent 2007 | 28.209334°N 85.77513°E |
| Lugula Himal | 6,889 | 22,602 | Gandaki Province | First ascent 2014 | 28.896533°N 84.259926°E |
| Kanjiroba | 6,883 | 22,582 | Kanjiroba Himal | | 29.4°N 82.6°E |
| Chumbu | 6,859 | 22,503 | Khumbu Mahalangur | First ascent November 3, 2022 | 28.013933°N 86.788414°E |
| Kubi Gangri | 6,859 | 22,503 | Himalayas | | 29.8°N 82.8°E |
| Jethi Bahurani | 6,850 | 22,470 | Himalayas | | 29.9°N 81°E |
| Hunku Chuli | 6,833 | 22,418 | Mahalangur | Also known as Hongku Chuli | 27.8175°N 87.0119°E |
| Ama Dablam | 6,812 | 22,349 | Barun Mahalangur | "Mother and her necklace" | 27.8611°N 86.8614°E |
| Khangri Shar | 6,811 | 22,346 | Khumbu Mahalangur | Unclimbed | 28.019746°N 86.812008°E |
| Chang Himal | 6,802 | 22,316 | Kanchenjunga | First ascent 1974 | 27.76574°N 88.08409°E |
| Drangnag Ri | 6,801 | 22,313 | Rolwaling | First ascent 1995 | 27.939402°N 86.524034°E |
| Kangtega | 6,782 | 22,251 | Barun Mahalangur | First ascent 1963 | 27.7833°N 86.8167°E |
| Takargo | 6,771 | 22,215 | Rolwaling | First ascent 2010 | 27.875578°N 86.509169°E |
| Khumjungar Himal | 6,759 | 22,175 | Damodar Himalaya | First ascent 2023 | 28.889141°N 84.126545°E |
| Tutse | 6,758 | 22,172 | Barun Mahalangur | Aka Peak 6 | 27°46′19″N 87°05′56″E |
| Cho Polu | 6,735 | 22,096 | Barun Mahalangur | First ascent 1999 | 27.9192°N 86.9819°E |
| Kang Nachugo | 6,735 | 22,096 | Joe Puryear, David Gottlieb | First ascent 2008 | 27.906036°N 86.442457°E |
| Changla | 6,721 | 22,051 | Himalayas | | 30.1°N 82.2°E |
| Likhu Chuli | 6,719 | 22,044 | Mahalangur | First ascent 2013 | 27.808787°N 86.540882°E |
| Lingtren | 6,714 | 22,028 | Khumbu Mahalangur | First ascent 1935 | 28.02°N 86.85°E |
| Tsoboje | 6,685 | 21,932 | Rolwaling | First ascent 1972 | 27.883333°N 86.488889°E |
| Num Ri | 6,677 | 21,906 | Barun Mahalangur | First ascent 2002 | 27.89472°N 86.97083°E |
| Peak 41 | 6,654 | 21,831 | Khumbu Mahalangur | First ascent 2002 | 27.774256°N 86.908738°E |
| Pholesobi | 6,652 | 21,824 | Kanchenjunga | First ascent 2024 | 27°41′10″N 88°00′36″E |
| Khang Karpo | 6,646 | 21,804 | Rolwaling | First ascent 1952 | 27°52′23″N 86°31′05″E |
| Khumbutse | 6,640 | 21,780 | Khumbu Mahalangur | First mountain west of Everest | 28.0203°N 86.8731°E |
| Kande Hiun Chuli | 6,627 | 21,742 | Himalayas | First ascent 1972 | 29.411871°N 82.558904°E |
| Changdi | 6,623 | 21,729 | Himalayas | Unclimbed | 29.7192°N 82.7986°E |
| Thamserku | 6,623 | 21,729 | Barun Mahalangur | First ascent 1964 | 27.7903°N 86.7875°E |
| Chulu | 6,584 | 21,601 | Himalayas | First ascent 1955 | 28.74147°N 84.02807°E |
| Dragmarpo Ri | 6,578 | 21,581 | Langtang | Unclimbed | 28.3257°N 85.6614°E |
| Malangphutang | 6,573 | 21,565 | Khumbu Mahalangur | First ascent 2000 | 27.807772°N 86.866896°E |
| Ghenge Liru | 6,571 | 21,558 | Langtang | First ascent 1963 | 28.2483°N 85.4717°E |
| Yansa Tsenji | 6,567 | 21,545 | Langtang | First ascent 2023 | 28.2572°N 85.605°E |
| Taboche | 6,542 | 21,463 | Khumbu Mahalangur | First ascent 1974 | 27.8975°N 86.7792°E |
| Karyolung | 6,511 | 21,362 | Rolwaling | FA 1982 | 27.733438°N 86.611939°E |
| Singu Chuli | 6,501 | 21,329 | Annapurna | Trekking peak | 28.58°N 83.9°E |
| Khatung Kang | 6,484 | 21,273 | Himalayas | First ascent 1956 | 28.7772°N 83.9194°E |
| Yakawa Kang | 6,482 | 21,266 | Damodar Himalaya | First ascent 2010 | 28.8078°N 83.9425°E |
| Mera Peak | 6,476 | 21,247 | Himalayas | Trekking peak | 27.7°N 86.8667°E |
| Hiunchuli | 6,441 | 21,132 | Annapurna | Trekking peak (difficult) | 28.5103°N 83.8519°E |
| Cholatse | 6,440 | 21,130 | Khumbu Mahalangur | Connected to Taboche | 27.92°N 86.7661°E |
| Langshisa Ri | 6,412 | 21,037 | Jugal Himal | First ascent 1982 | 28.2169°N 85.7136°E |
| Tsar Tse | 6,398 | 20,991 | Himalayas | First ascent 2018 | |
| Ganchenpo | 6,378 | 20,925 | Langtang | First ascent 1971 | 28.168874°N 85.678351°E |
| Kusum Kangguru | 6,367 | 20,889 | Barun Mahalangur | Trekking peak (difficult) | 27.7306°N 86.7908°E |
| Ombigaichan | 6,340 | 20,800 | Barun Mahalangur | | 27.852816°N 86.883436°E |
| Merra | 6,334 | 20,781 | Kanchenjunga | First ascent 2006 | |
| Gandharwa Chuli | 6,248 | 20,499 | Annapurna | First ascent 2013 | |
| Om Parvat | 6,191 | 20,312 | Himalayas | Sacred summit | 30.1988°N 81.0347°E |
| Kongde Ri | 6,187 | 20,299 | Barun Mahalangur | Trekking peak (difficult) | 27.7931932°N 86.6431456°E |
| Imja Tse | 6,160 | 20,210 | Khumbu Mahalangur | Also known as Island Peak. Popular trekking peak. | 27.92°N 86.93°E |
| Kyazo Ri | 6,151 | 20,180 | Khumbu Mahalangur | First ascent 2002 | 27.909067°N 86.671287°E |
| Lobuche | 6,145 | 20,161 | Khumbu Mahalangur | Trekking peak | 27.9595°N 86.7899°E |
| Pisang Peak | 6,091 | 19,984 | Annapurna | Trekking peak | 28.6461°N 84.1883°E |
| Nirekha | 6,069 | 19,911 | Khumbu Mahalangur | Trekking peak (difficult) | 27.977478°N 86.762703°E |
| Abi | 6,043 | 19,826 | Khumbu Mahalangur | Also known as Cholo | 27.9843°N 86.7195°E |
| Phari Lapcha | 6,017 | 19,741 | Khumbu Mahalangur | First ascent 2003 | 27.929108°N 86.680911°E |
| Thapa Peak | 6,012 | 19,724 | Himalayas | Also known as Dhampus | 28.7979°N 83.60527°E |
| Ponggen Dopku | 5,928 | 19,449 | Jugal | | 28.1626803°N 85.6129635°E |
| Arakam Tse | 5,904 | 19,370 | Khumbu Mahalangur | First ascent 2013 | 27.94172°N 86.75265°E |
| Naya Kanga | 5,863 | 19,236 | Langtang | Trekking peak | 28.168322°N 85.548541°E |
| Baden-Powell Peak | 5,825 | 19,111 | Jugal | Formerly known as Urkema Peak | 28.16757°N 85.53337°E |
| Pokalde | 5,806 | 19,049 | Khumbu Mahalangur | Trekking peak (moderate) | 27.925°N 86.8333°E |
| Mount Khumbila | 5,761 | 18,901 | Mahalangur | Unclimbed | 27.8505°N 86.7°E |
| Tharpu Chuli | 5,663 | 18,579 | Annapurna | Trekking peak | 28.6°N 83.9°E |
| Kongma Tse | 5,649 | 18,533 | Mahalangur | | 27.944034°N 86.838729°E |
| Amphu Gyabjen | 5,647 | 18,527 | Khumbu Mahalangur | First ascent 1953 | 27°52′52″N 86°52′05″E |
| Kala Patthar | 5,545 | 18,192 | Khumbu Mah | Popular hiking peak below Pumori | 28°N 86.83°E |
| Yala Peak | 5,520 | 18,110 | Langtang | | 28.2286°N 85.628°E |
| Bhalu Lek | 5,425 | 17,799 | Himalayas | | 28.98°N 82.4°E |
| Gokyo Ri | 5,357 | 17,575 | Everest Region | Popular hiking peak | 27.9611°N 86.6833°E |

== Other ranges ==
- North of the Greater Himalayas in western Nepal, the ~6,100 metre Tibetan Border Ranges form the Ganges-Brahmaputra divide, which the international border generally follows.
- South of the Greater Himalayas, Nepal has a High Mountain region of ~4,000 metre summits, then the Middle Hills and Mahabharat Range with 1,500 to 3,000 metre summits.
- South of the Mahabharats, an outer range of foothills with ~1,000 metre summits is called the Siwaliks or Churiya Hills.

== Gallery of highest peaks ==
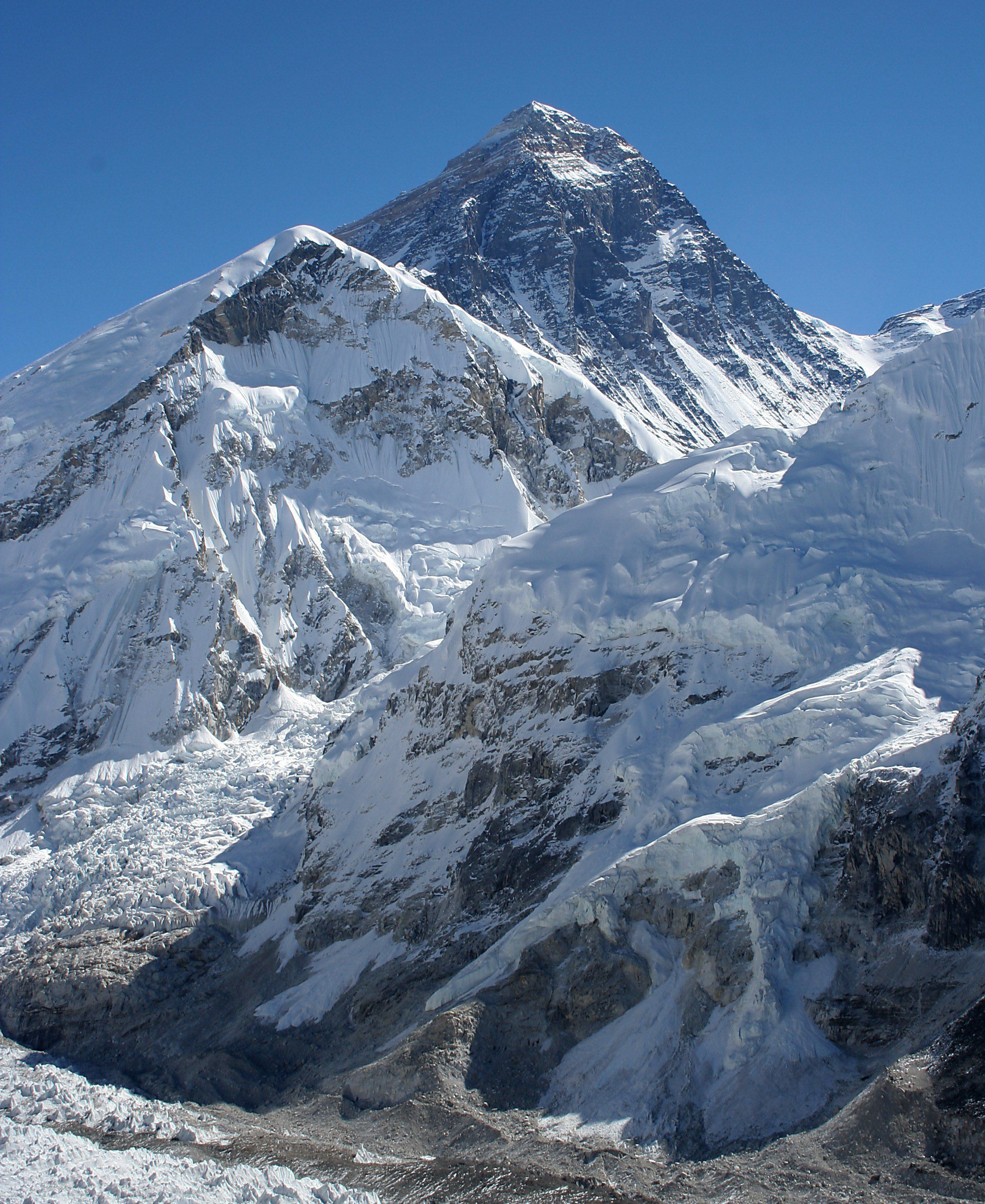
Everest

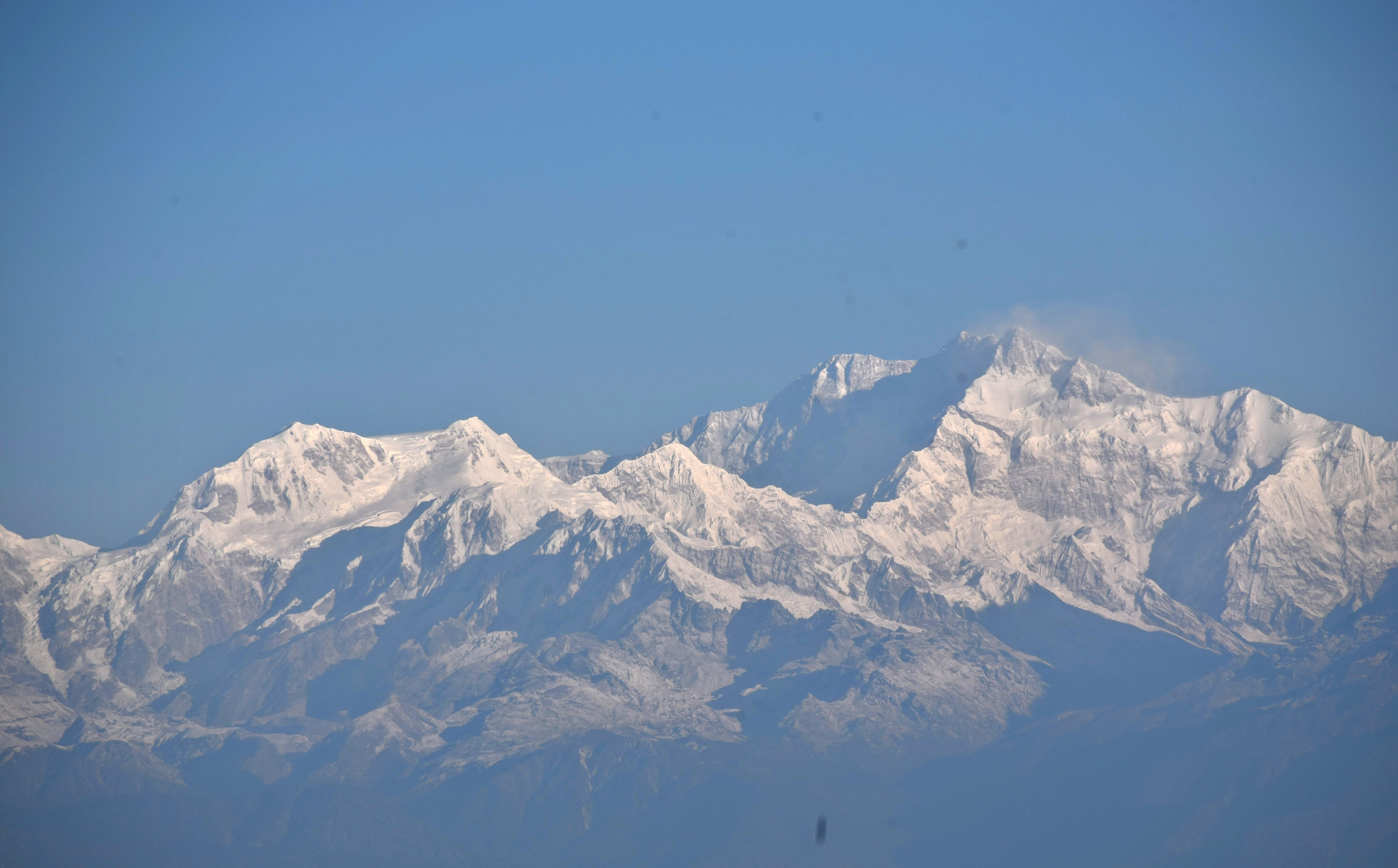
Kangchenjunga

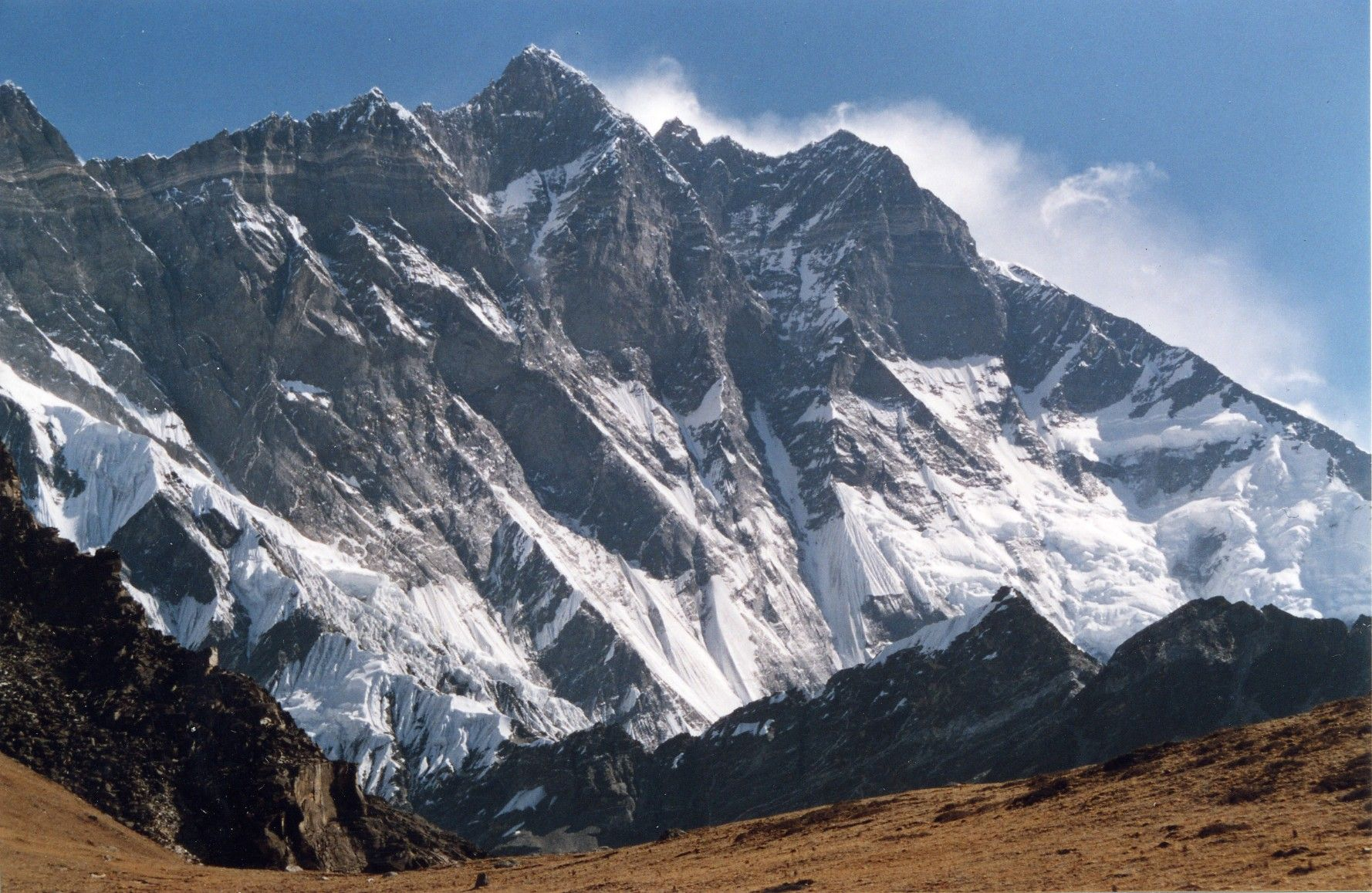
Lhotse

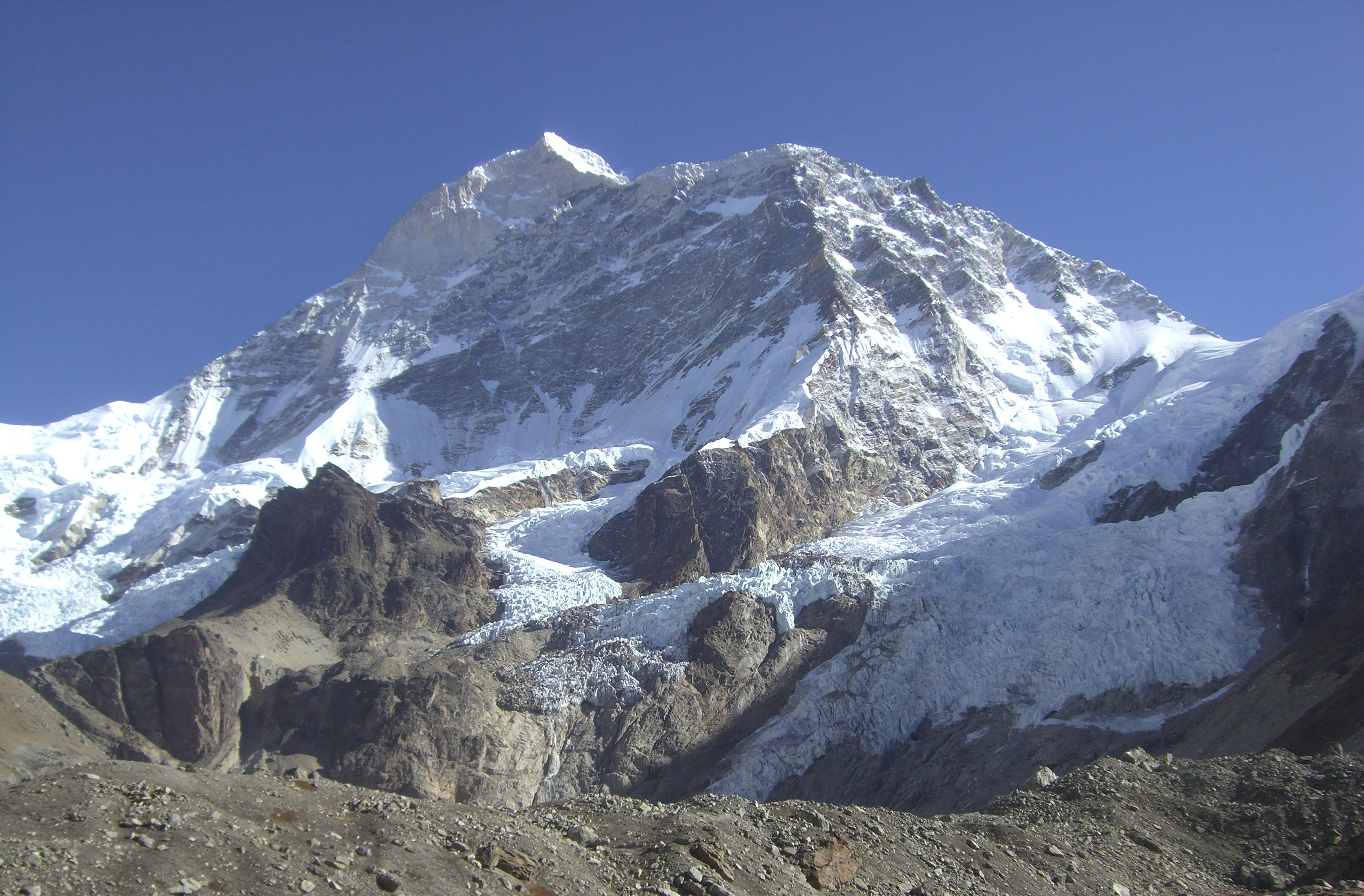
Makalu

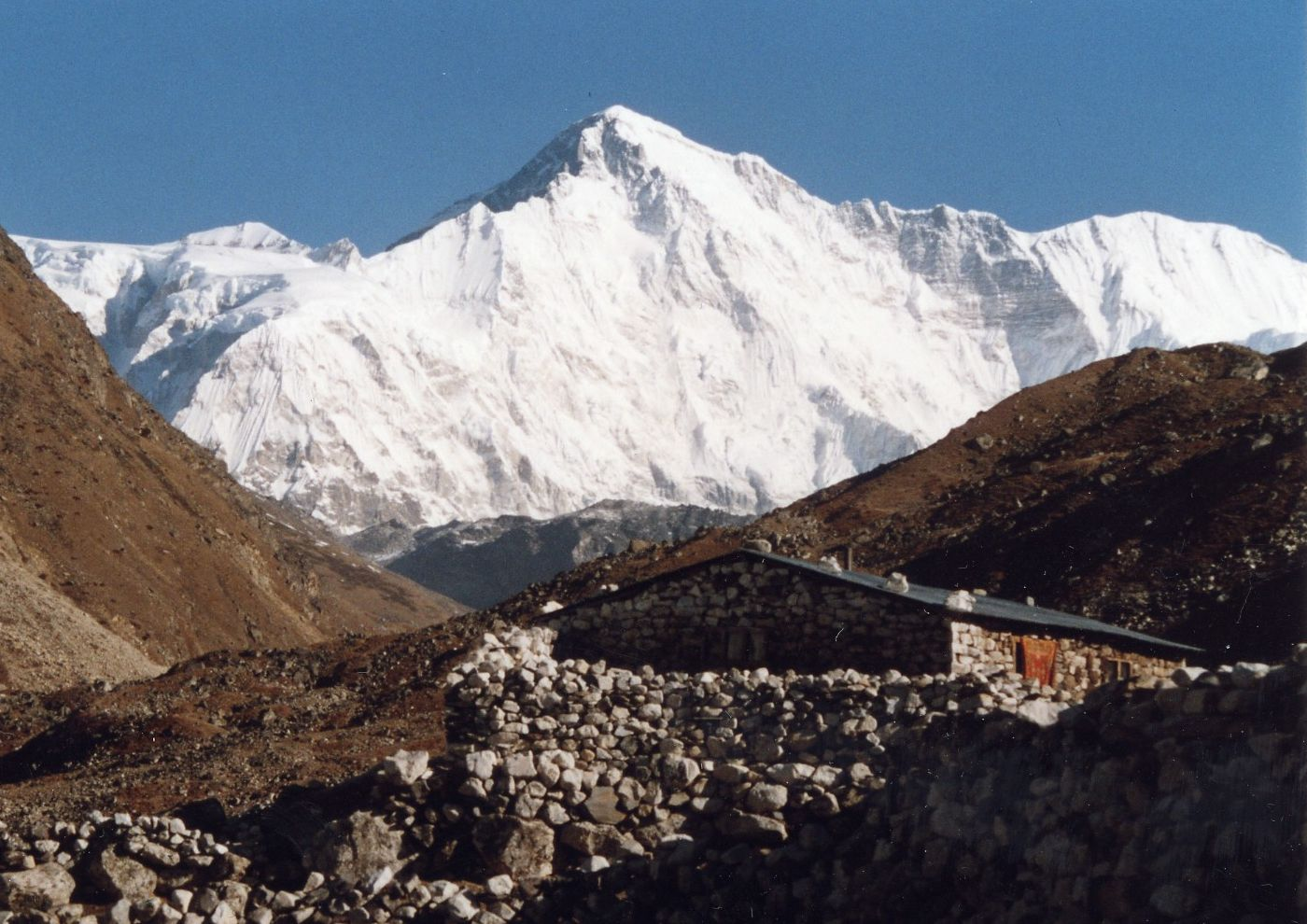
Cho Oyu

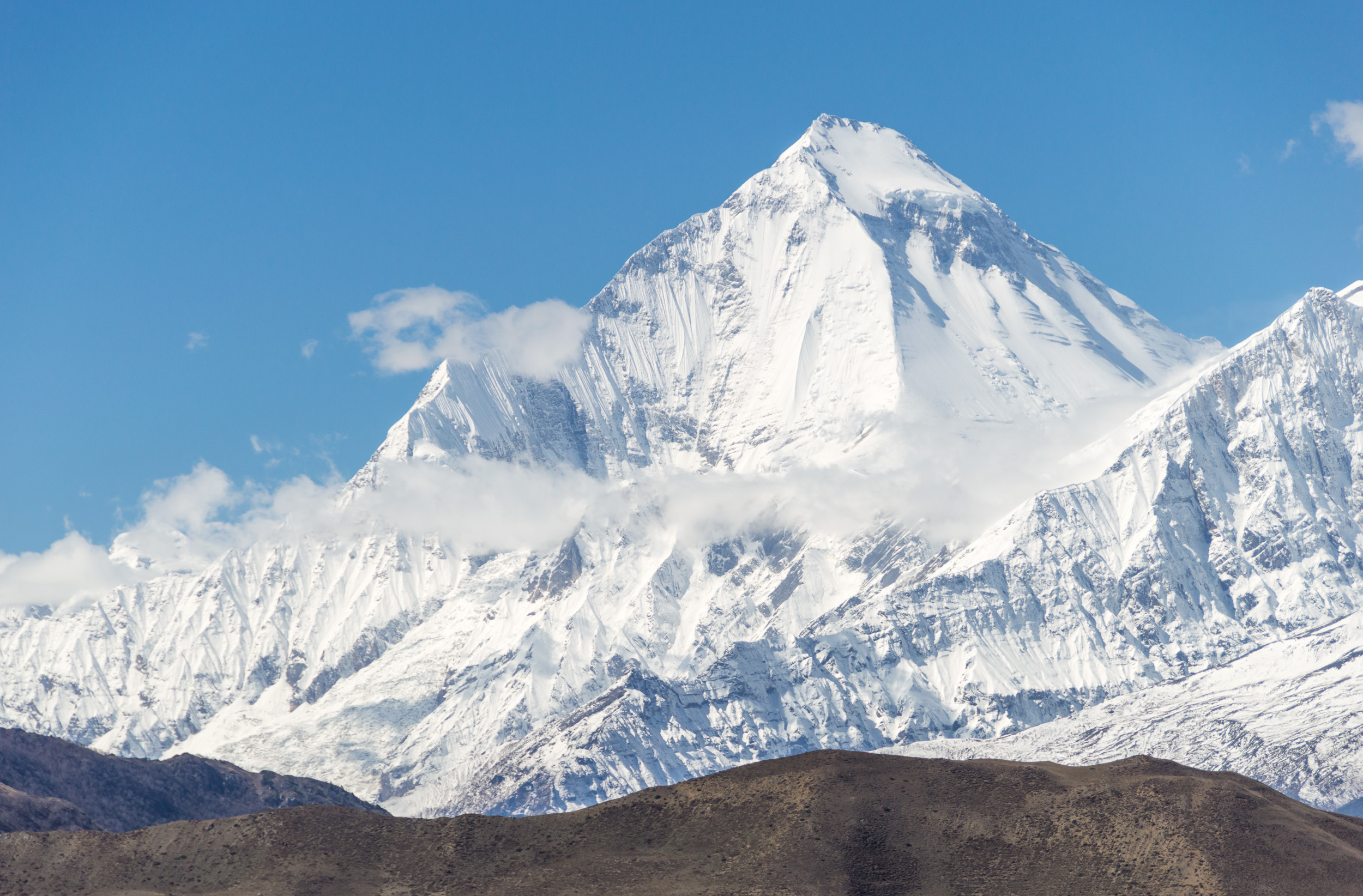
Dhaulagiri I

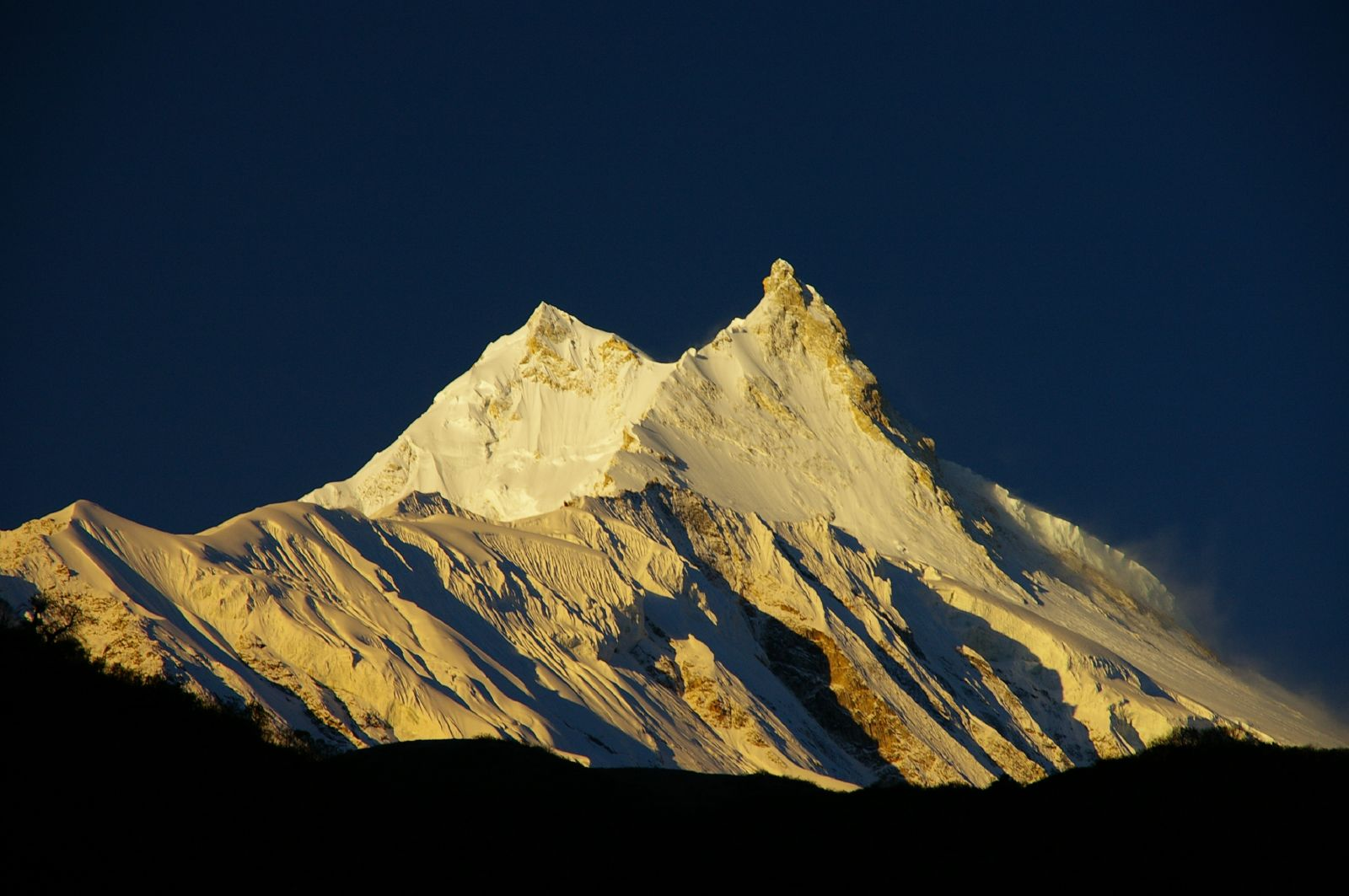
Manaslu

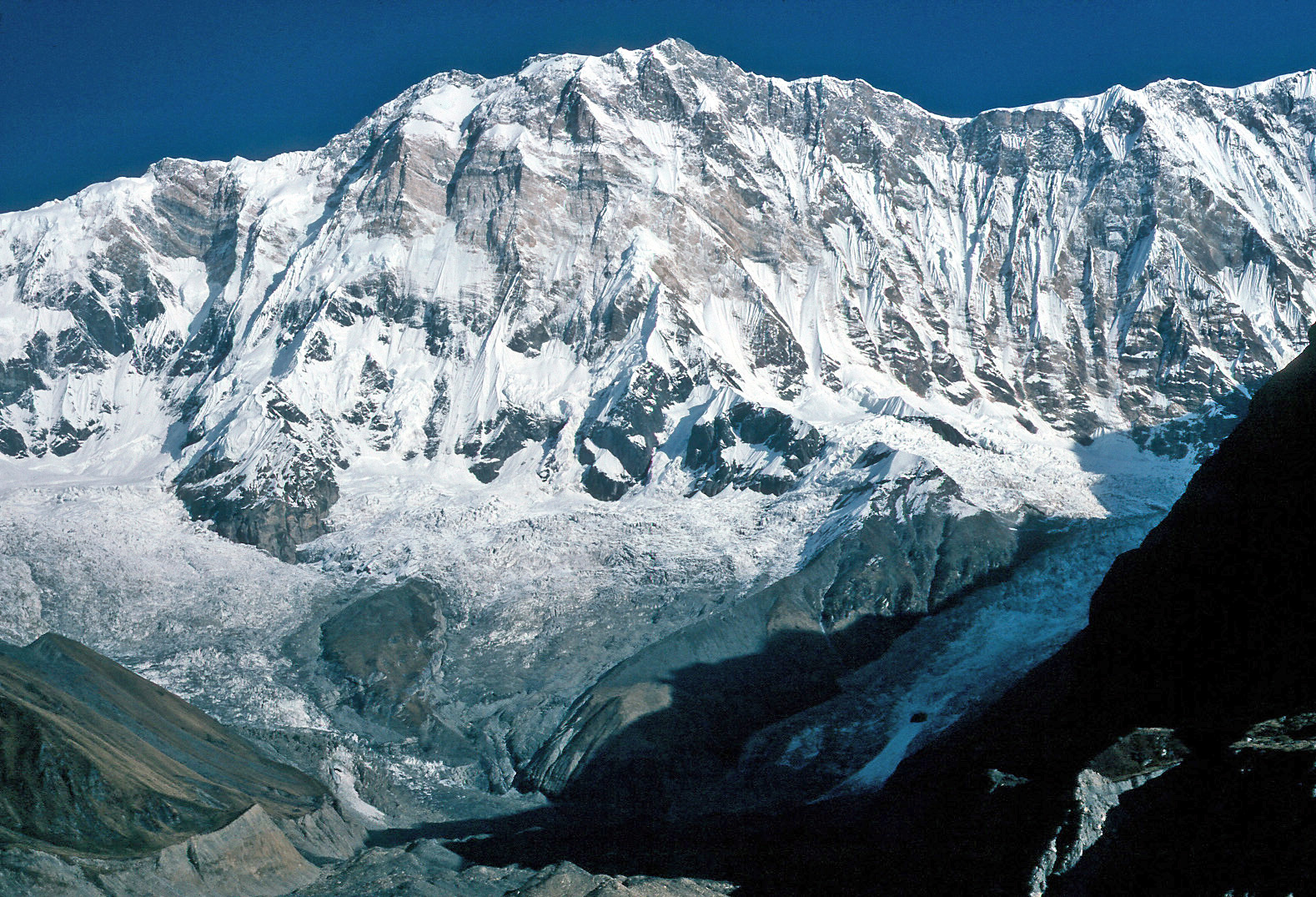
Annapurna I

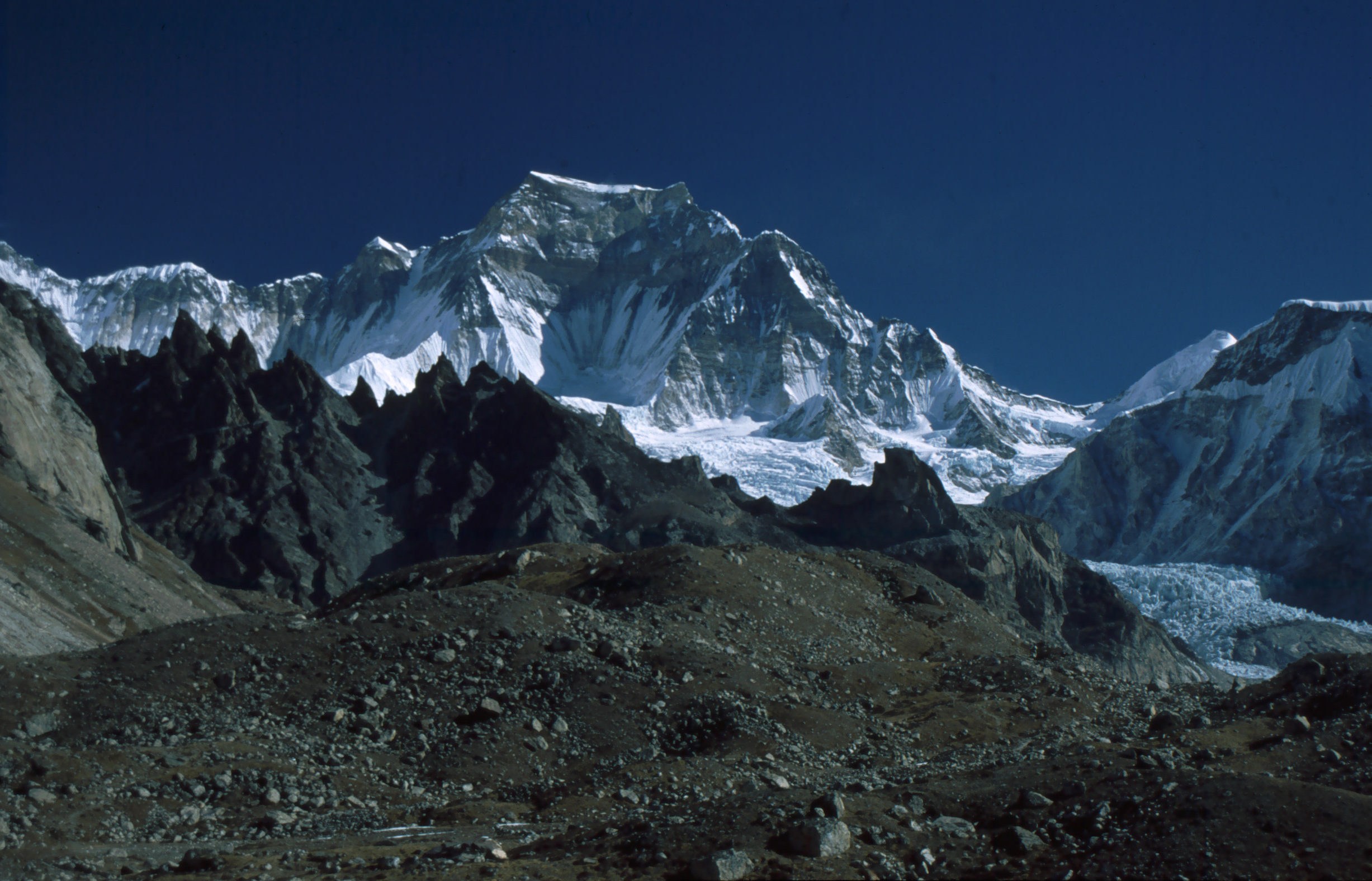
Gyachung Kang

== See also ==
- List of unclimbed mountains of Nepal
- List of highest mountains
