= Kande Hiun Chuli =

Mountain in Nepal

- Kā̃de Hiū Chuli̇̄
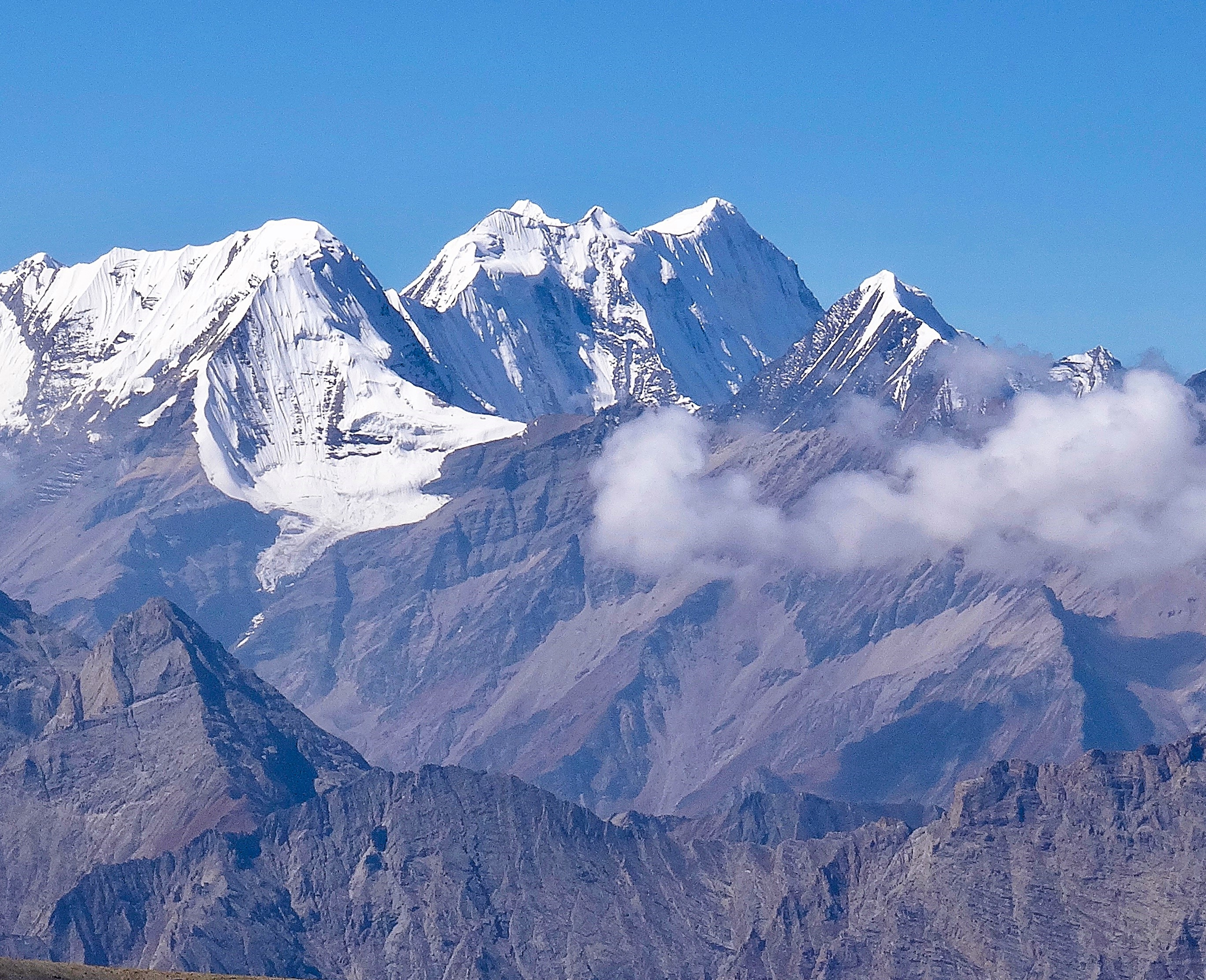
- Northeast aspect, centered in back

Highest point
- Elevation: 6,627 m (21,742 ft)
- Prominence: 915 m (3,002 ft)
- Parent peak: Kanjiroba
- Isolation: 8.6 km (5.3 mi)
- Listing: Mountains of Nepal
- Coordinates: 29°24′41″N 82°33′37″E

Geography
- Location within Nepal
- Interactive map of Kande Hiun Chuli
- Country: Nepal
- Province: Karnali
- Districts: Mugu, Dolpa and Jumla
- Protected area: Shey Phoksundo National Park
- Parent range: Himalayas; Patrasi Himal

Climbing
- First ascent: 1972

Kande Hiun Chuli, also known as Kande Hiunchuli or Kā̃de Hiū Chuli̇̄, is a mountain in Nepal.

== Description ==
Kande Hiun Chuli is a 6,627-metre (21,742-foot) glaciated summit on the western boundary of Shey Phoksundo National Park in the Himalayas. It is set in the Karnali Province at the triple boundary point shared by the Mugu, Dolpa, and Jumla districts. Kande Hiun Chuli represents the highest point of the Mugu and Jumla districts. This peak should not be confused with Hiunchuli of the Annapurna massif.

Precipitation runoff from the mountain's southeast slope drains to the Bheri River, the west slope to Tila River, and the north slope to Namlan River, all three of which are tributaries of the Karnali River. Topographic relief is significant as the summit rises 1,420 metres (4,660 ft) in one kilometre (0.62 mi) along the north slope.

== Climbing history ==
The first ascent of the summit was made on October 18, 1972, by Toyokazu Hirota and Shigeru Kuwahata via the southwest ridge. Another source claims the mountain was climbed on September 13, 1963, by Norio Hoshino and a Sherpa, however the government of Nepal recognizes the 1972 ascent as the first.

== Climate ==
Based on the Köppen climate classification, Kande Hiun Chuli is located in a tundra climate zone with cold, snowy winters, and cool summers. Weather systems are forced upwards by the Himalaya mountains (orographic lift), causing heavy precipitation in the form of rainfall and snowfall. This climate supports glaciers on the peak's north, southeast, and west slopes. Mid-June through early-August is the monsoon season. The months of April, May, September, October, and November offer the most favorable weather for viewing or climbing this peak.

== See also ==
- Geology of the Himalayas
