= Dragmarpo Ri =

Mountain in Nepal/China

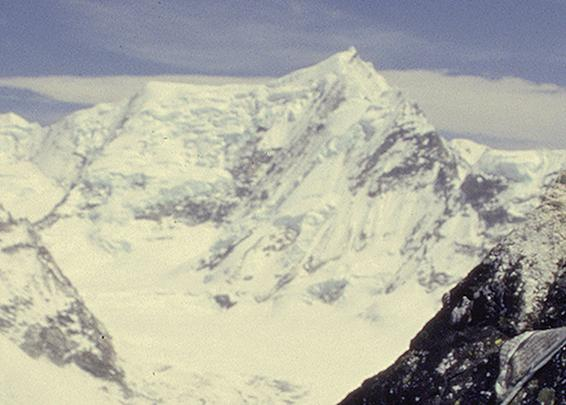
- Dragmarpo Ri as seen from SW direction (from Yala Peak)

Highest point
- Elevation: 6,599 m (21,650 ft)
- Prominence: 235 m (771 ft)
- Listing: Mountains of Nepal; Mountains of China
- Coordinates: 28°17′47″N 85°40′00″E

Geography
- Location within Nepal Location within Tibet
- Location: Langtang, Nepal - Tibet, China
- Parent range: Himalayas

Climbing
- First ascent: not climbed

Dragmarpo Ri is a mountain straddling the border between Nepal and the People's Republic of China.

== Location ==
The peak is located at 6,200 m (20,300 ft) above sea level. The prominence is 235 m (771 ft).
