= Thulagi Chuli =

Mountain in Nepal

- Thulagi Peak
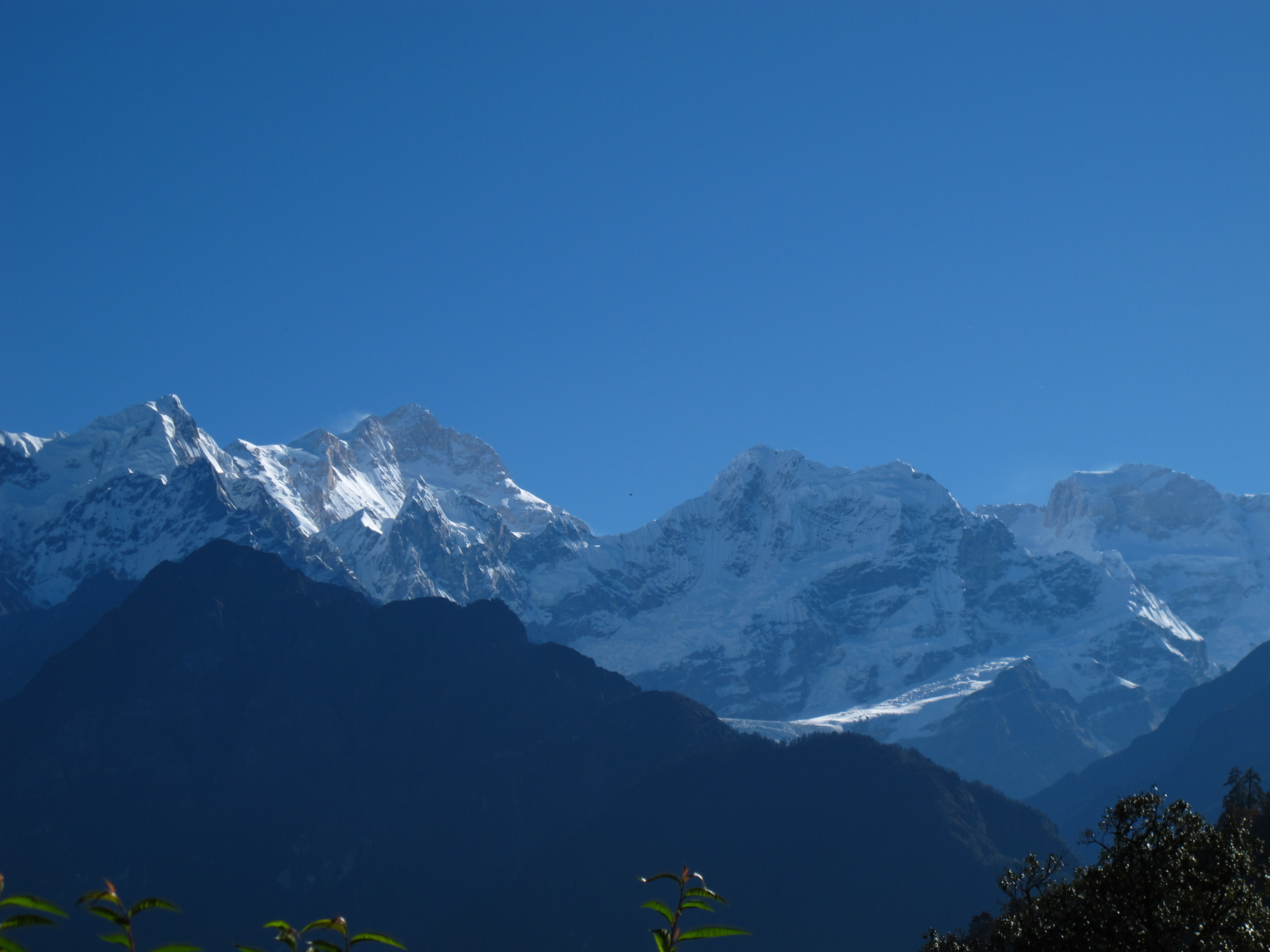
- Thulagi Chuli, third from the left

Highest point
- Elevation: 7,059 m (23,159 ft)
- Prominence: 699 m (2,293 ft)
- Listing: Mountains of Nepal
- Coordinates: 28°31′40″N 84°31′40″E

Geography
- Location within Nepal
- Country: Nepal
- Province: Gandaki
- District: Gorkha
- Parent range: Mansiri Himal

Climbing
- First ascent: 2015 by a Russian team

Thulagi Chuli (or Thulagi Peak) is a mountain in Mansiri Himal, a high subrange of the Himalayas in north-central Nepal.

== Location ==
The peak is located at 7,059 m (23,159 ft) above sea level and the prominence is at 699 m (2,293 ft). The southward-flowing Thulagi Glacier separates the Thulagi Chuli from Manaslu, 8,163 m (26,781 ft) to the northeast and the Ngadi Chuli, 7,871 m (25,823 ft) to the east.

== Climbing history ==
Mountaineers from Russia named Aleksander Gukov, Ivan Dozhdev, Valeriy Shamalo, and Ruslan Kirichenko successfully scaled Thulagi Chuli for the first time in September 2015. A Russian trio attempted the peak in 2010 but they aborted on summit attempt day due to the length and complexity of the route they had chosen.
