= Pholesobi =

Mountain in Nepal

- Pholesobi̇̄ Thoṅje
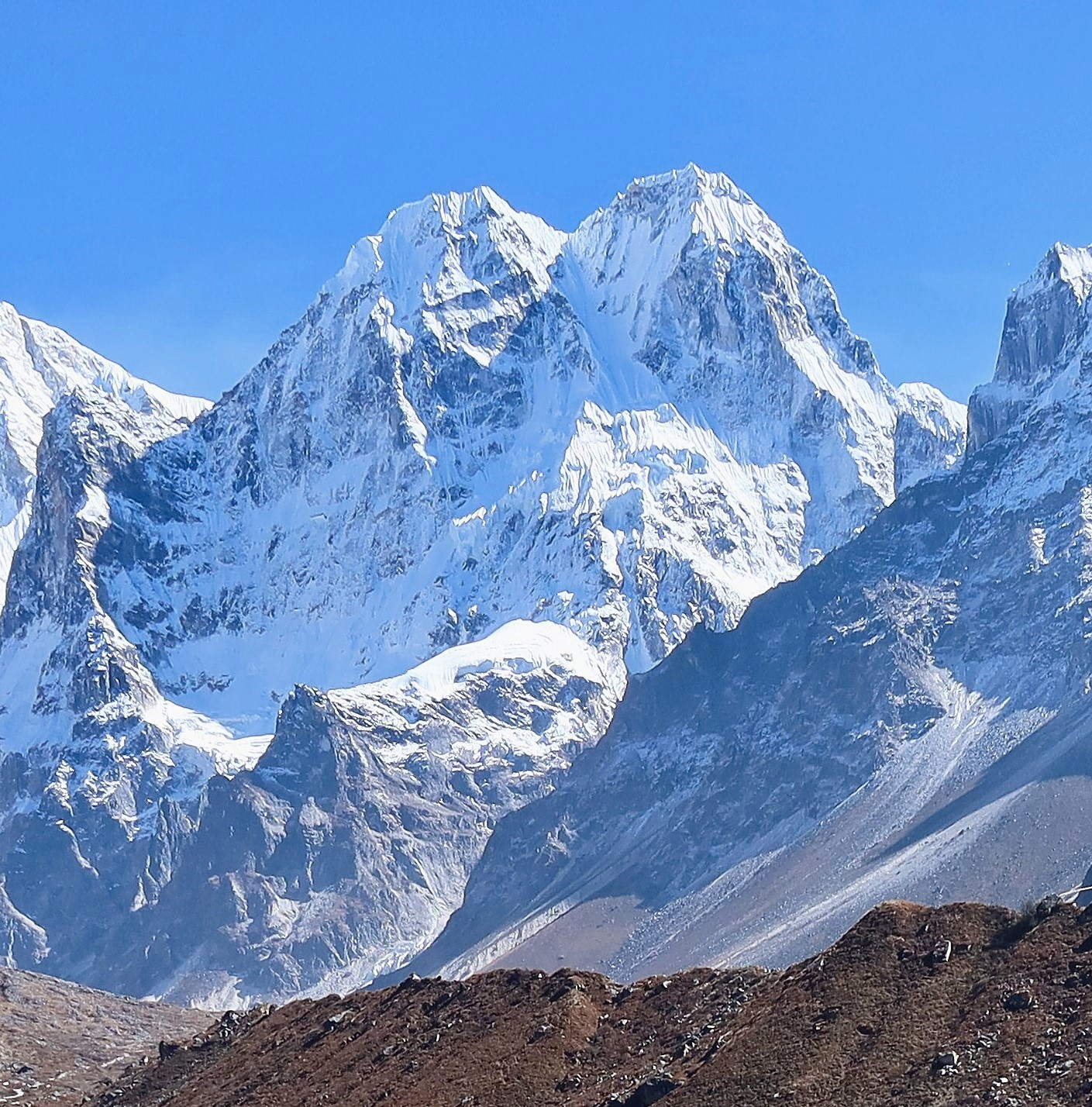
- Northwest aspect

Highest point
- Elevation: 6,652 m (21,824 ft)
- Prominence: 682 m (2,238 ft)
- Parent peak: Jannu
- Isolation: 2 km (1.2 mi)
- Coordinates: 27°41′09″N 88°00′36″E

Geography
- Location within Nepal
- Interactive map of Pholesobi
- Country: Nepal
- Province: Koshi
- District: Taplejung
- Protected area: Kanchenjunga Conservation Area
- Parent range: Himalayas

Geology
- Rock type: Granite

Climbing
- First ascent: 2024

Pholesobi, or Pholesobi̇̄ Thoṅje, is a mountain in Nepal.

== Description ==
Pholesobi is a 6,652-metre (21,824-foot) glaciated double summit in the Nepalese Himalayas. The lower peak is Phole, 6,645 metres. The mountain is situated 11 kilometres (6.8 mi) west of Kangchenjunga and two kilometres (1.2 mi) west of Jannu in the Kanchenjunga Conservation Area. Precipitation runoff from the mountain's slopes drains to the Ghunsa River → Tamur River → Kosi River → Ganges. Topographic relief is significant as the summit rises 2,000 metres (6,562 ft) above the Kumbhakarna Glacier in two kilometres (1.2 mi). The first ascent of the summit was achieved on October 31, 2024, by Hidesuke Taneishi and Hiroki Yamamoto via the north face.

== Climate ==
Based on the Köppen climate classification, Pholesobi is located in a tundra climate zone with cold, snowy winters, and cool summers. Weather systems coming off the Bay of Bengal are forced upwards by the Himalaya mountains (orographic lift), causing heavy precipitation in the form of rainfall and snowfall. Mid-June through early-August is the monsoon season. The months of April, May, September, and October offer the most favorable weather for viewing or climbing this peak.

== Gallery ==
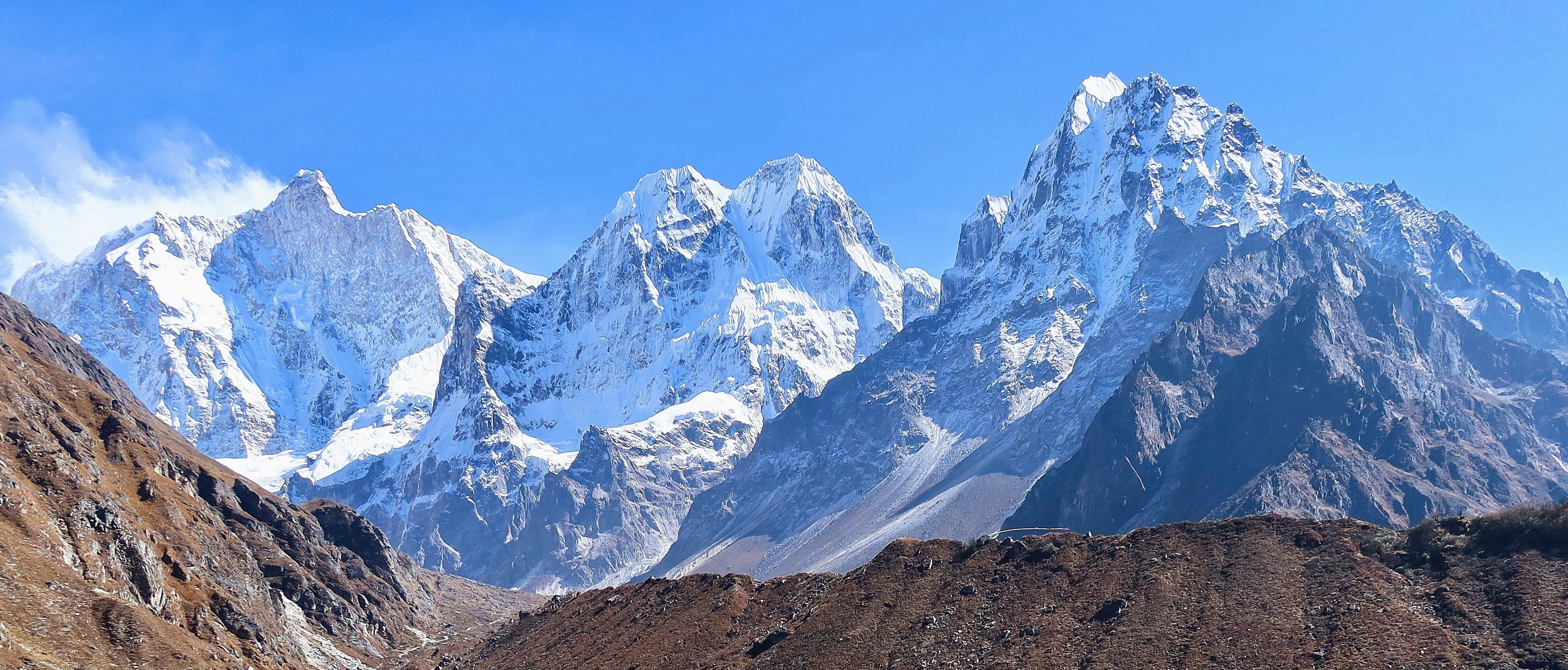
Jannu (left) and Pholesobi centered

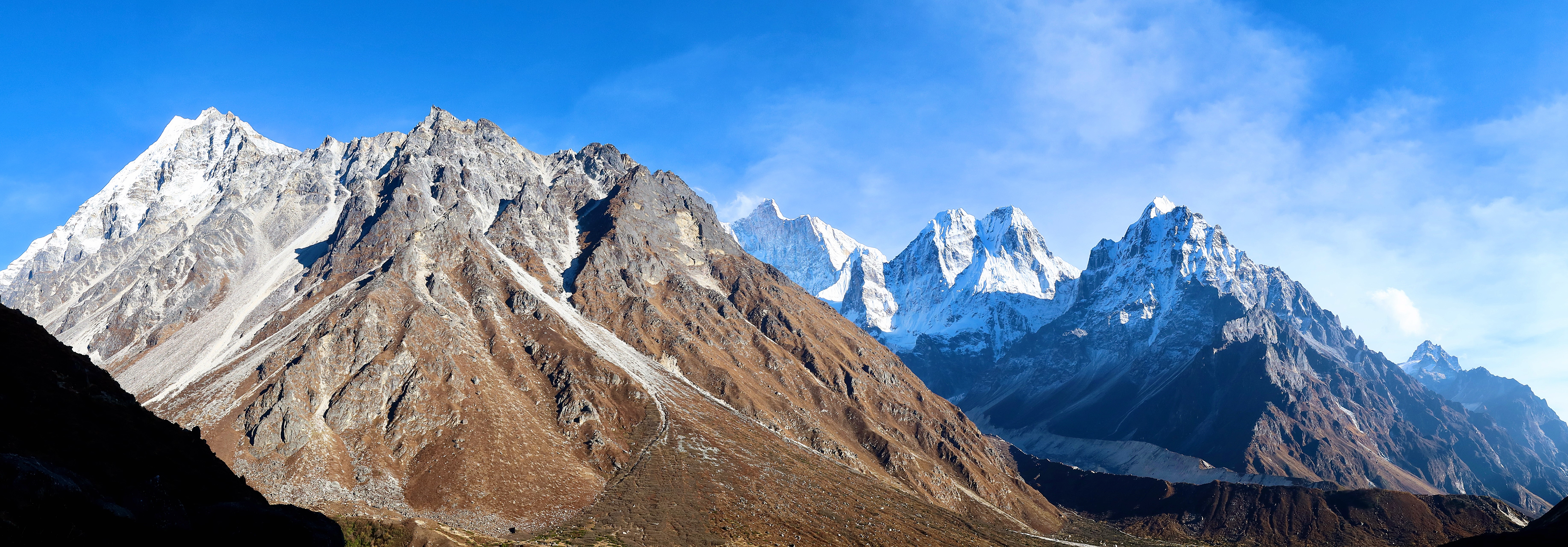
L→R:Merra, Jannu, Pholesobi, 6294

== See also ==
- Geology of the Himalayas
