= Lugula Himal =

Mountain peak in Nepal

- Location within Nepal Location within Tibet Location within China Location within Asia

Highest point
- Elevation: 6889
- Prominence: 1,040 m (3,410 ft)
- Coordinates: 28°53′47″N 84°15′34″E

Naming
- Native name: लुगुला हिमाल

Geography
- Country: Nepal
- Parent range: Himalayas

Lugula Himal (also known as Lagula Himal) is a mountain peak in the Himalayas, located on the border of North western region of Nepal and the Tibet Autonomous Region of China.

== Location ==
The 6,889 m (22,602 ft) high Lugula Himal is located in the mountain range Peri Himal. The mountain lies in a west-east ridge that forms the state border and watershed between Yarlung Tsangpo in the north and Marshyangdi River in the south. 3.22 km further west is the 6,361 m (20,869 ft) high Bhrikuti Sail, 3.15 km east of the Chako with 6,734 m (22,093 ft). Further east is the next higher mountain, the 7,035 m (23,081 ft) high Ratna Chuli.

== Climbing history ==
The official first ascent of Lugula Himal took place on April 23, 2014 by a South Korean expedition (Hong Seung-gi and Feme Sherpa, as well as Bum Won-taek and Lakpa Sherpa). Before that, on November 2, 2010, there was an unofficial, unauthorized ascent of Lugula Himal by a Frenchman.
