= Nirekha =

Mountain in Khumbu, Nepal

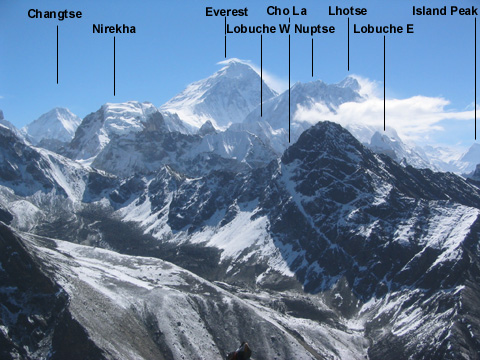
- Nirekha

Highest point
- Elevation: 6,169 m (20,240 ft)

Geography
- Location: Khumbu, Nepal
- Parent range: Himalayas

Climbing
- First ascent: Matt Fioretti, Greg Valentine
- Easiest route: W-face

Nirekha peak, Nepal, is in the same chain as the Lobuche summits, east of the Cho La Col (not to be confused with the famous Cho La pass a few hundred meters away). The peak is in the list of the new 'A' trekking peaks, for which, in 2006, a peak fee of $500 had to be paid.

The normal ascent to the Nirekha Peak is a great and—depending on the conditions—difficult climb, at difficulty AD+/D-. Only experienced climbers should attempt this route, though it is partially saved with fixed ropes. The summit consists of two pyramids. It is unclear which one is higher. The north summit is easier but requires crossing a difficult crevasse, while the south summit requires one pitch in steep 50° ice.

The Kanchung BC is the preferable starting point; from the lake camp, it is hardly doable in one day. Both ascents are scenically beautiful.

The first ascent was done by Matt Fioretti and Greg Valentine in April 2003. The second ascent was done by an all-women team in October 2003.
