= Peak 41 =

Mountain in Nepal

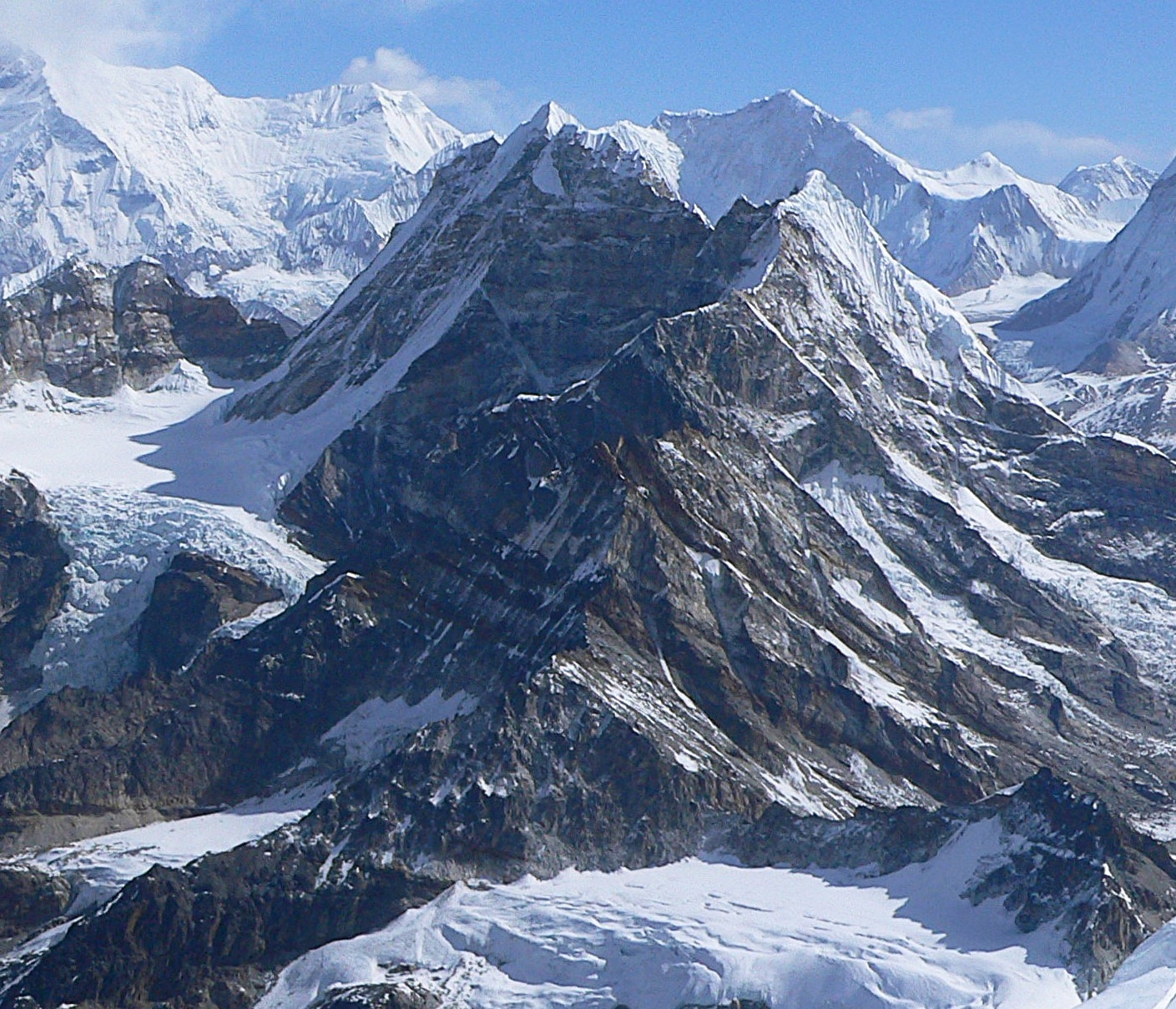
- South aspect

Highest point
- Elevation: 6,654 m (21,831 ft)
- Prominence: 914 m (2,999 ft)
- Isolation: 6.29 km (3.91 mi)
- Coordinates: 27°46′27″N 86°54′31″E

Geography
- Location within Nepal
- Interactive map of Peak 41
- Country: Nepal
- Province: Koshi
- District: Solukhumbu
- Protected area: Makalu Barun National Park
- Parent range: Himalayas; Mahalangur Himal

Climbing
- First ascent: October 2002

Peak 41 is a mountain in Nepal.

== Description ==
Peak 41 is a 6,654-metre (21,831-foot) glaciated summit in the Nepalese Himalayas. It is situated 19 kilometres (12 mi) east of Namche Bazaar in Makalu Barun National Park. Precipitation runoff from the mountain's slopes drains into tributaries of the Dudh Koshi. Topographic relief is significant as the summit rises 1,550 metres (5,085 ft) above the Mera Glacier in one kilometre (0.62 mi). The first ascent of the summit was made on October 16, 2002, by a team of Slovenian climbers: Urban Golob, Uros Samec, and Matic Jost. The northeast face was first climbed in 2016 by South Koreans: Koo Eun-soo, Han Dong-ik, and Yoo Hak-jae.

== Climate ==
Based on the Köppen climate classification, Peak 41 is located in a tundra climate zone with cold, snowy winters, and cool summers. Weather systems coming off the Bay of Bengal are forced upwards by the Himalaya mountains (orographic lift), causing heavy precipitation in the form of rainfall and snowfall. Mid-June through early-August is the monsoon season. The months of April, May, September, and October offer the most favorable weather for viewing or climbing this peak.

== Gallery ==
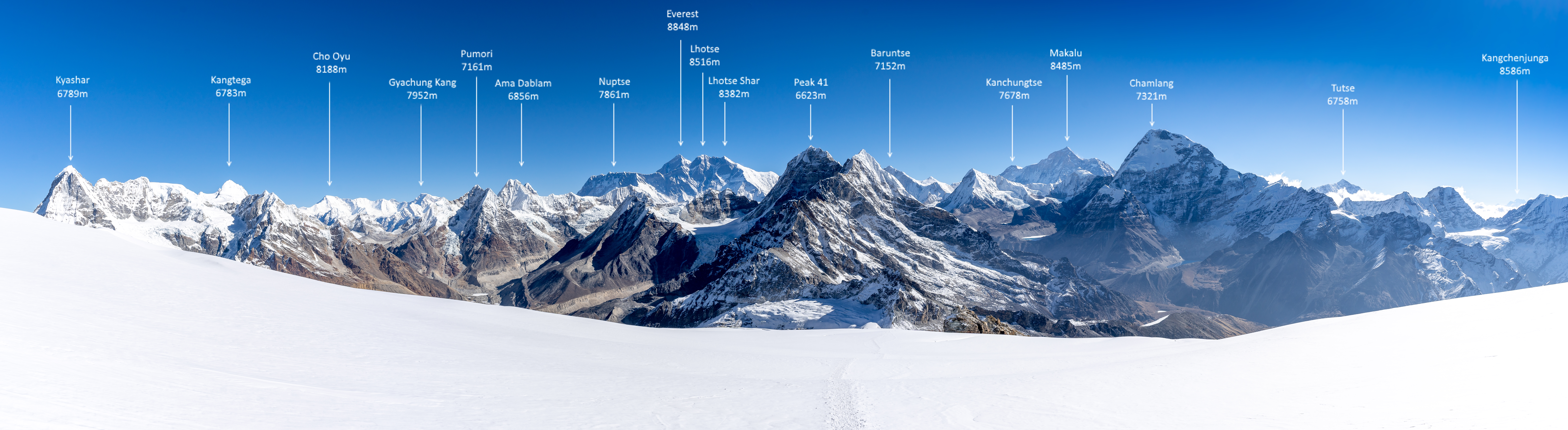
Peak 41 centered

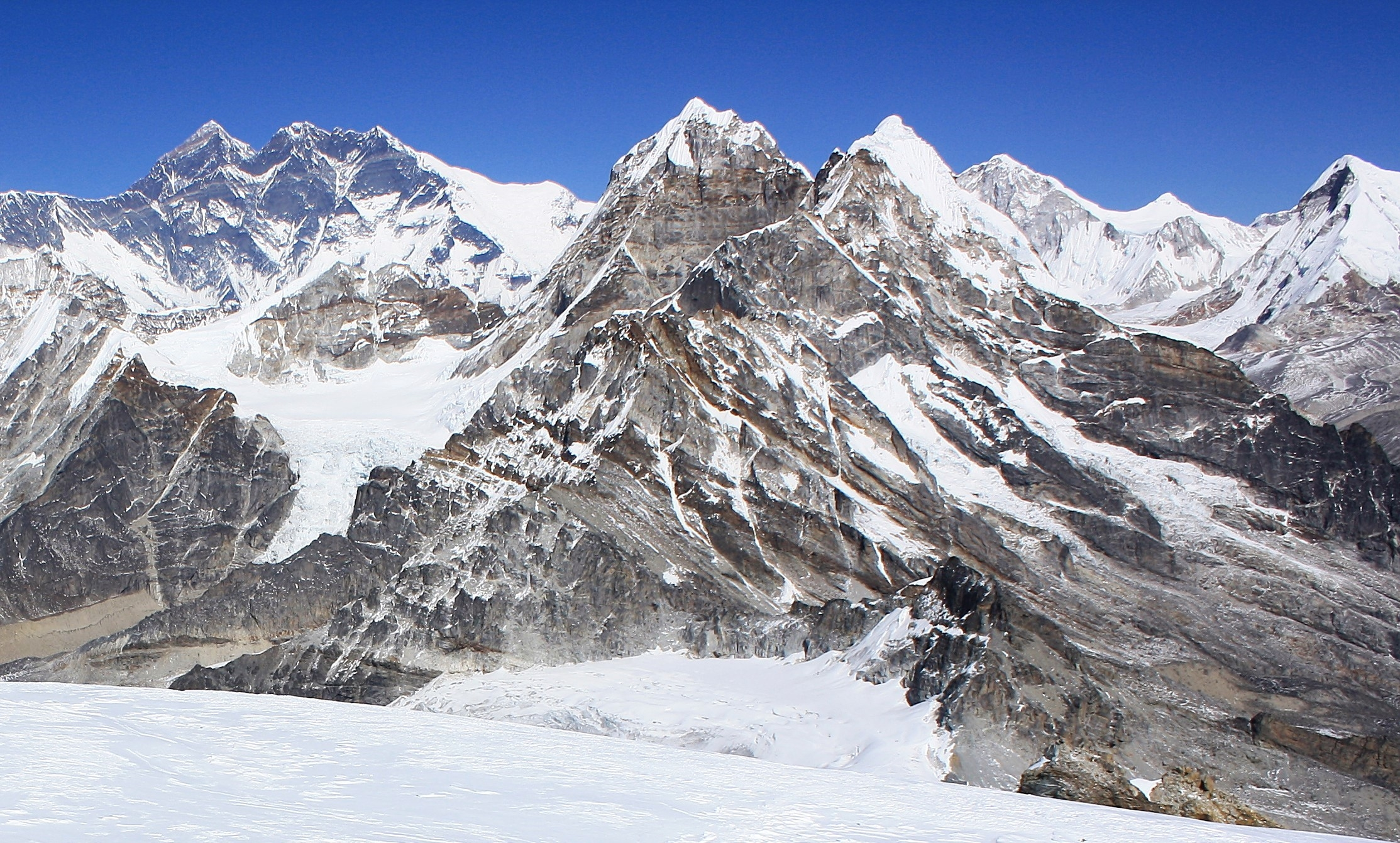
Peak 41 centered. Everest/Lhotse to distant left

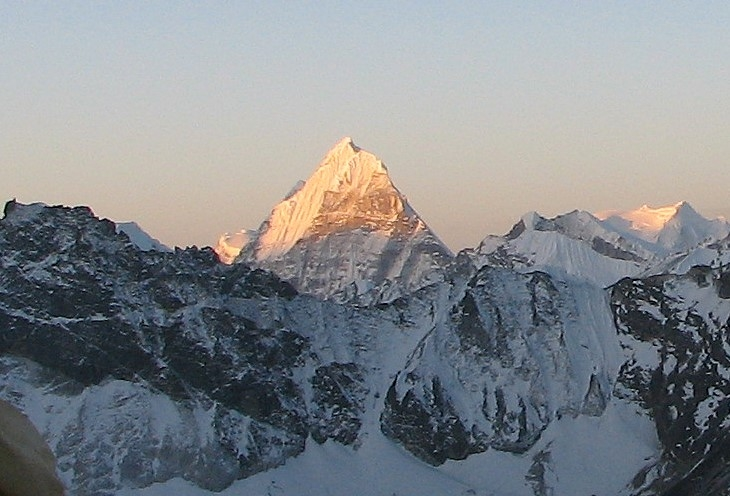
North aspect at sunrise

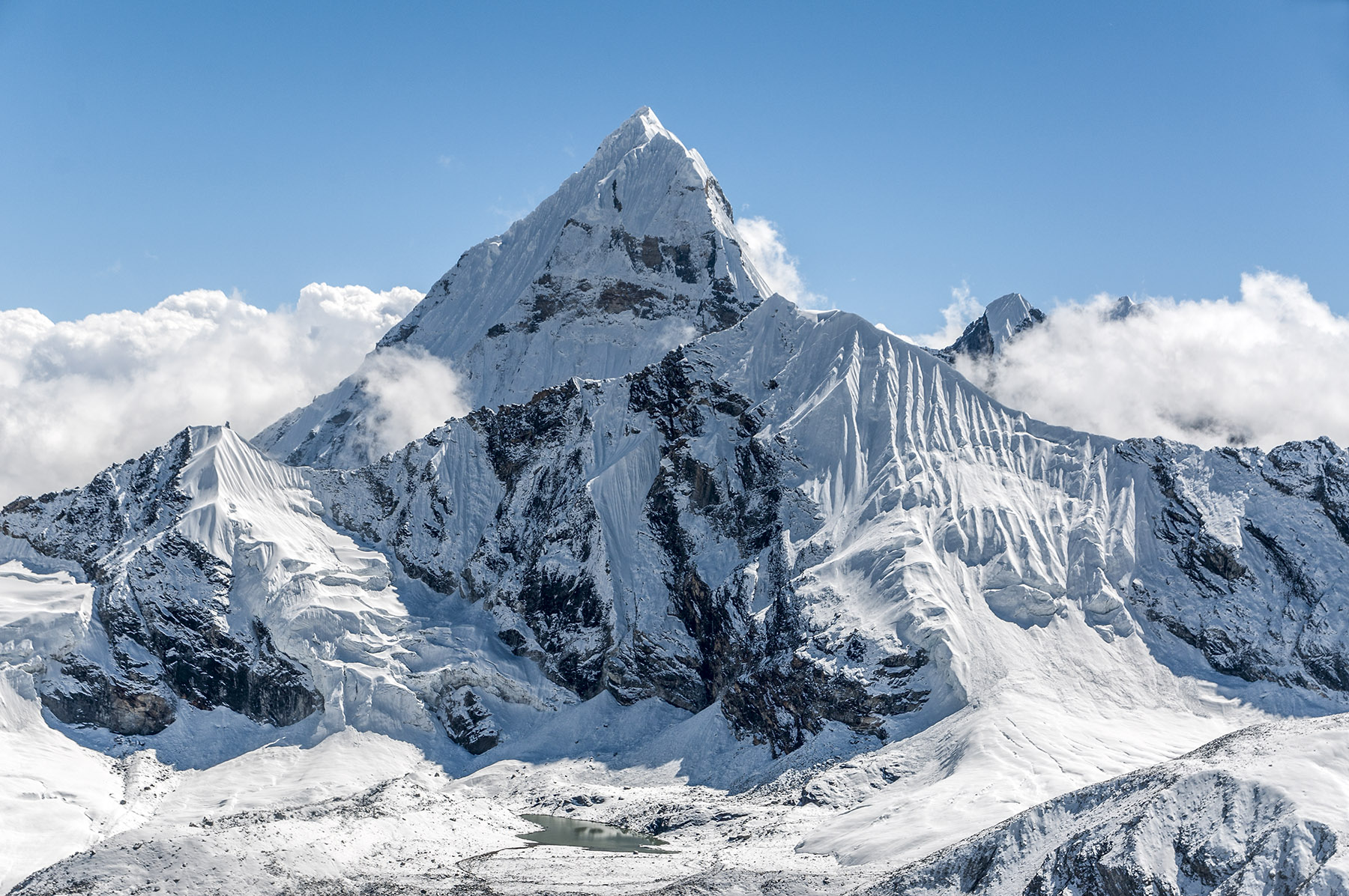
North aspect

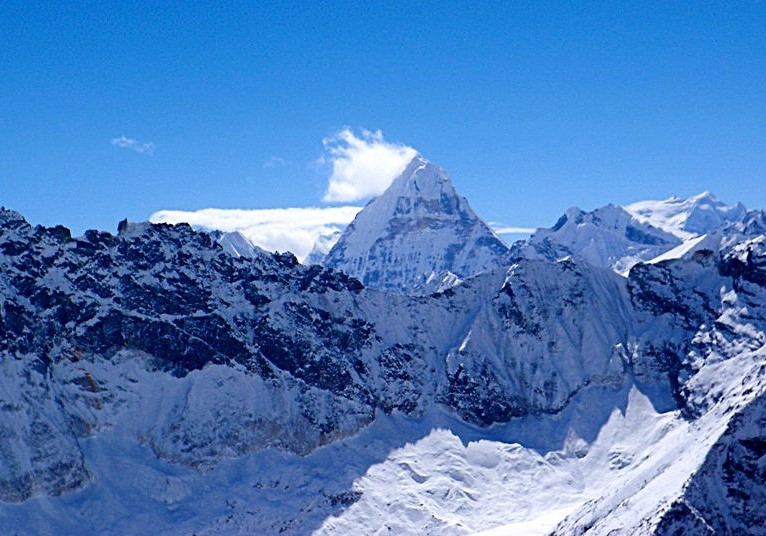
North aspect viewed from Island Peak

== See also ==
- Geology of the Himalayas
