= Ponggen Dopku =

Mountain in Nepal

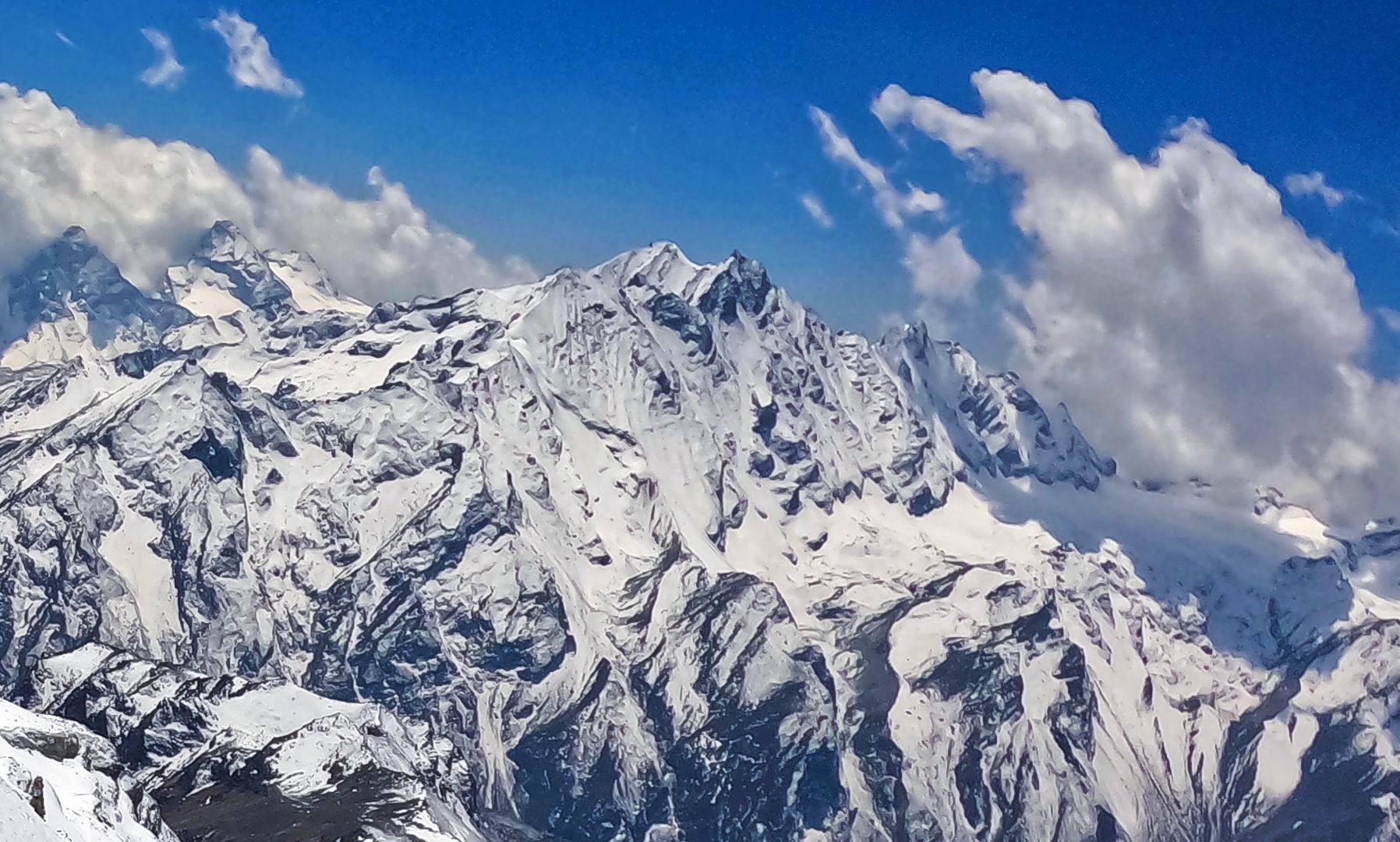
- North aspect

Highest point
- Elevation: 5,928 m (19,449 ft)
- Prominence: 742 m (2,434 ft)
- Isolation: 6.4 km (4.0 mi)
- Coordinates: 28°09′44″N 85°36′48″E

Geography
- Location within Nepal
- Interactive map of Ponggen Dopku
- Location: Langtang
- Country: Nepal
- Province: Bagmati
- District: Rasuwa
- Protected area: Langtang National Park
- Parent range: Himalayas; Jugal Himal

Ponggen Dopku, also spelled Pongen Dopku, is a mountain in Nepal.

== Description ==
Ponggen Dopku is a 5,928-metre (19,449-foot) glaciated summit in the Nepali Himalayas. The elevation has also been reported as 5,930 metres. The peak is situated 55 kilometres (34 mi) north-northeast of Kathmandu above the Langtang Valley of Langtang National Park. Precipitation runoff from the mountain's slopes drains to the Trishuli River via Lānṭān Kholā. Topographic relief is significant as the summit rises 2,000 metres (6,561 ft) above the Langtang Valley in 3.5 kilometres (2.2 mi). The nearest higher peak is Ganchenpo, 6.4 kilometres (4.0 mi) to the east.

== Climate ==
Based on the Köppen climate classification, Ponggen Dopku is located in a tundra climate zone with cold, snowy winters, and cool summers. Weather systems coming off the Bay of Bengal are forced upwards by the Himalaya mountains (orographic lift), causing heavy precipitation in the form of rainfall and snowfall. Mid-June through early-August is the monsoon season.

== Gallery ==
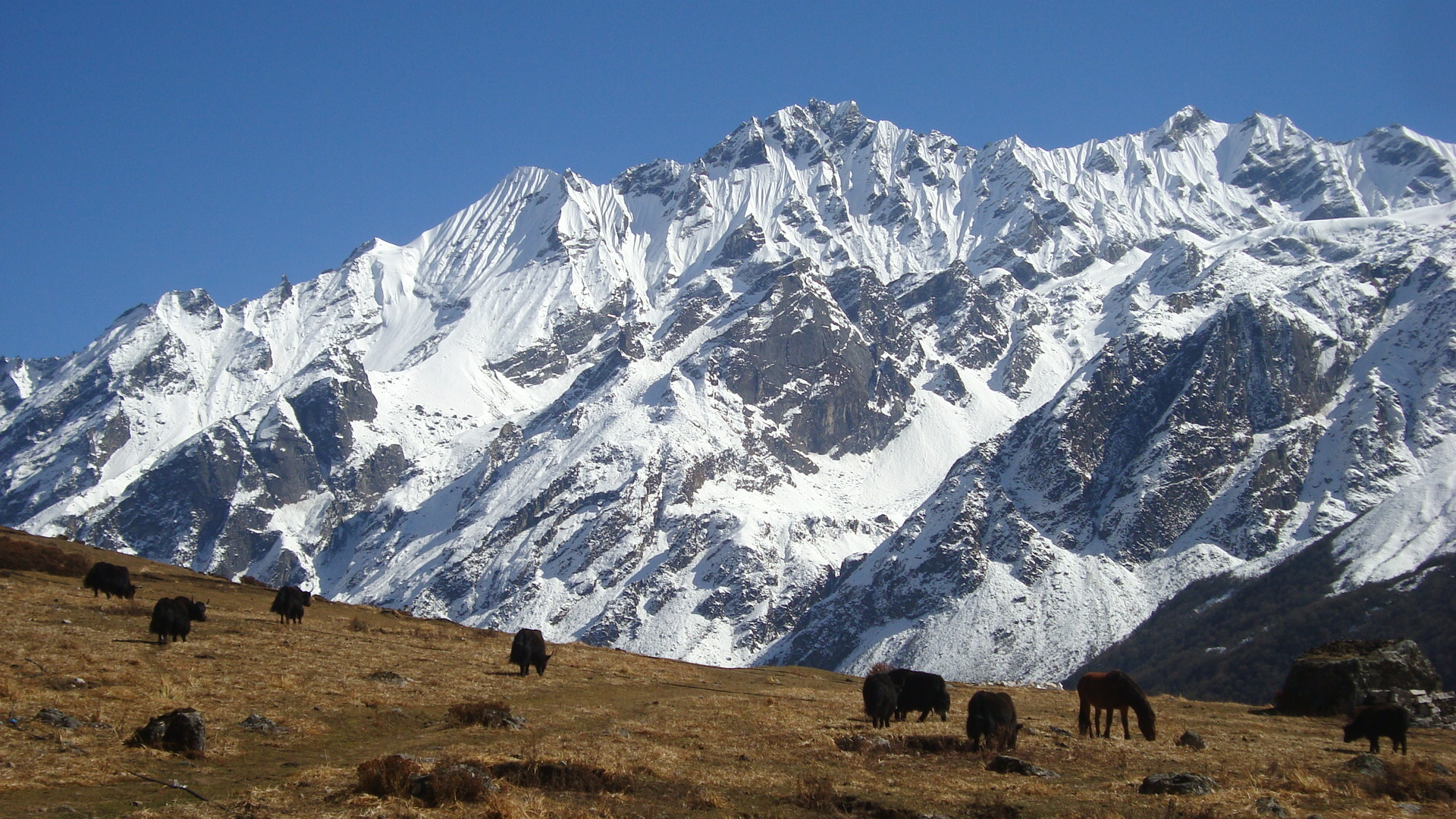
Northwest aspect

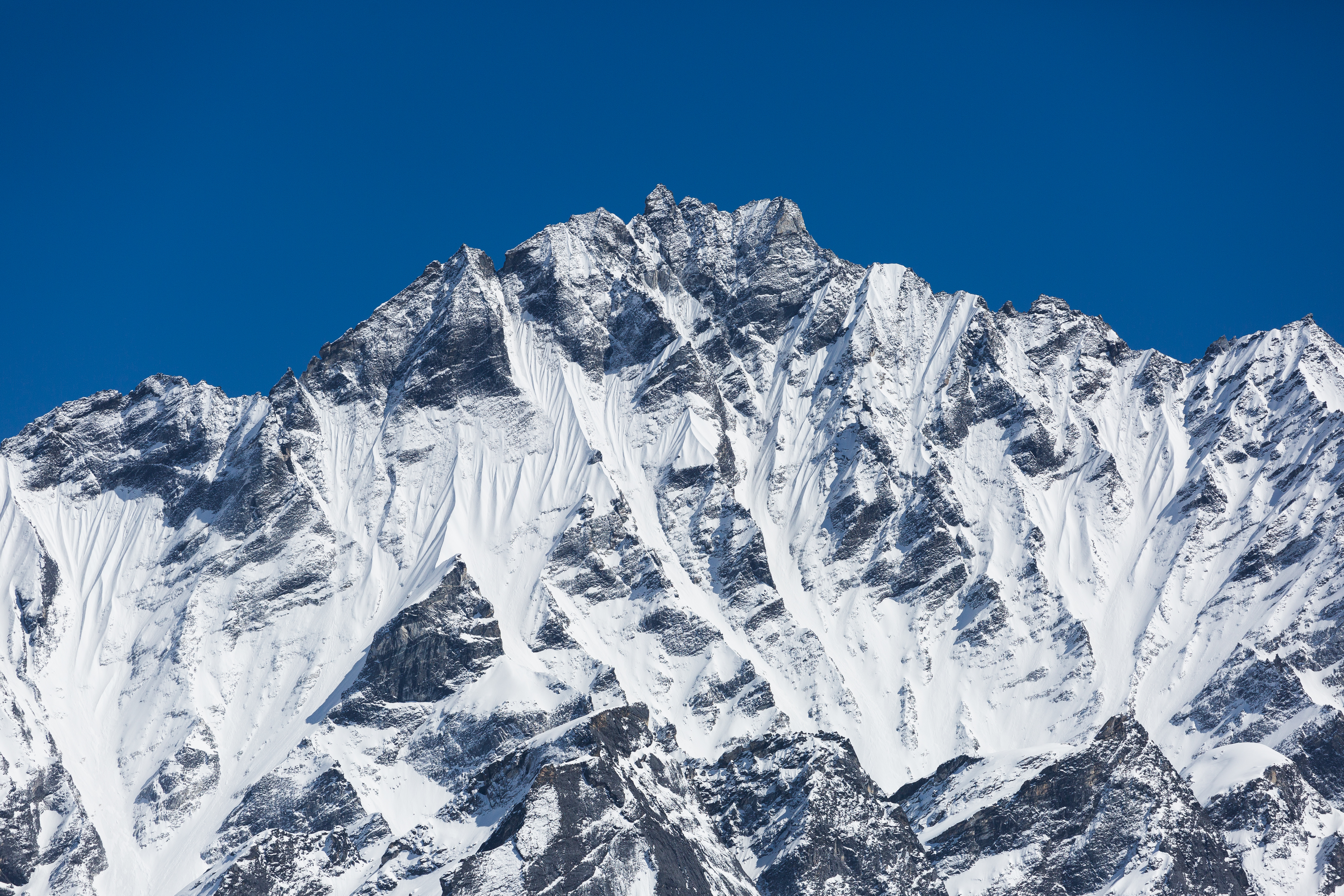
Northwest aspect

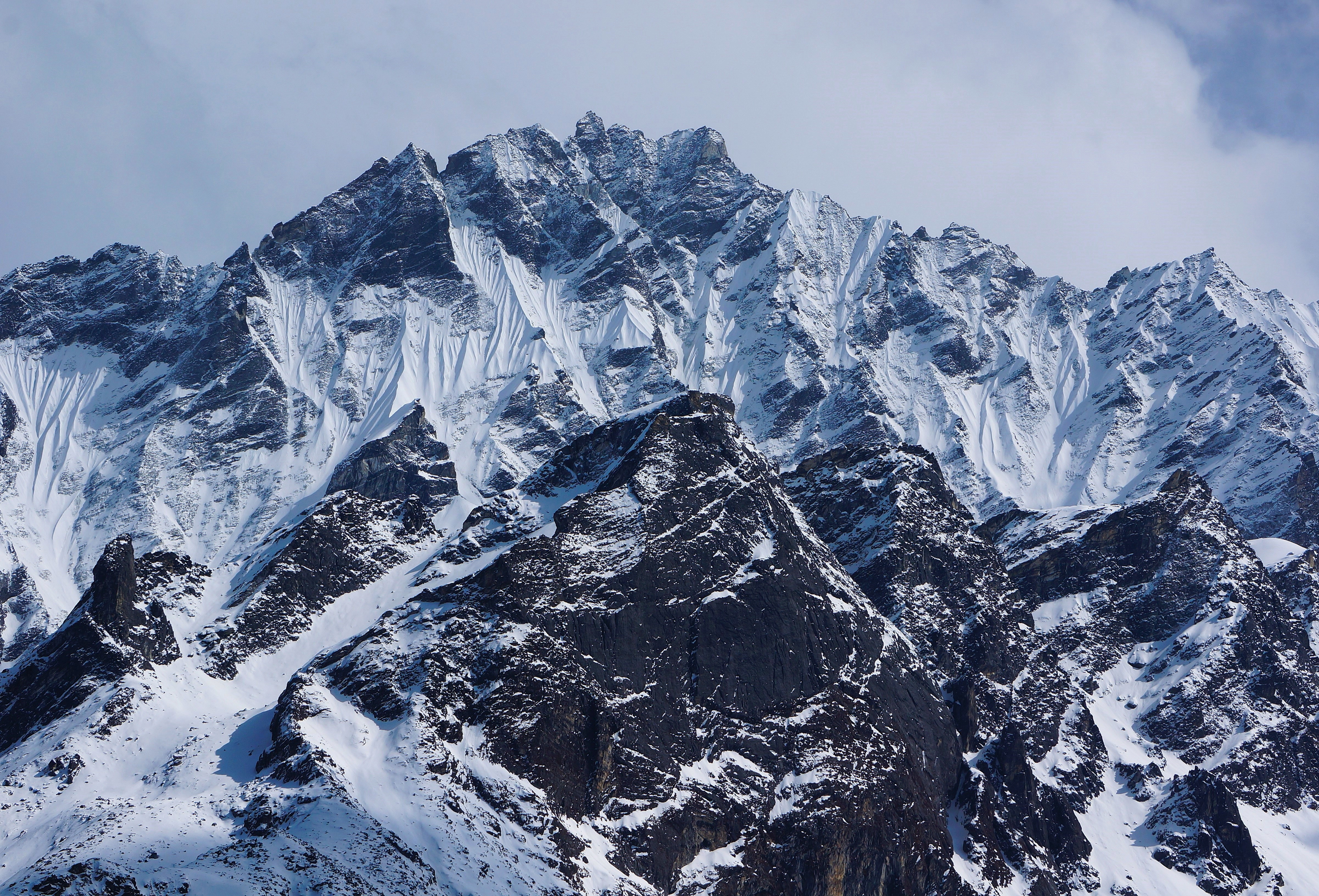
Northwest aspect

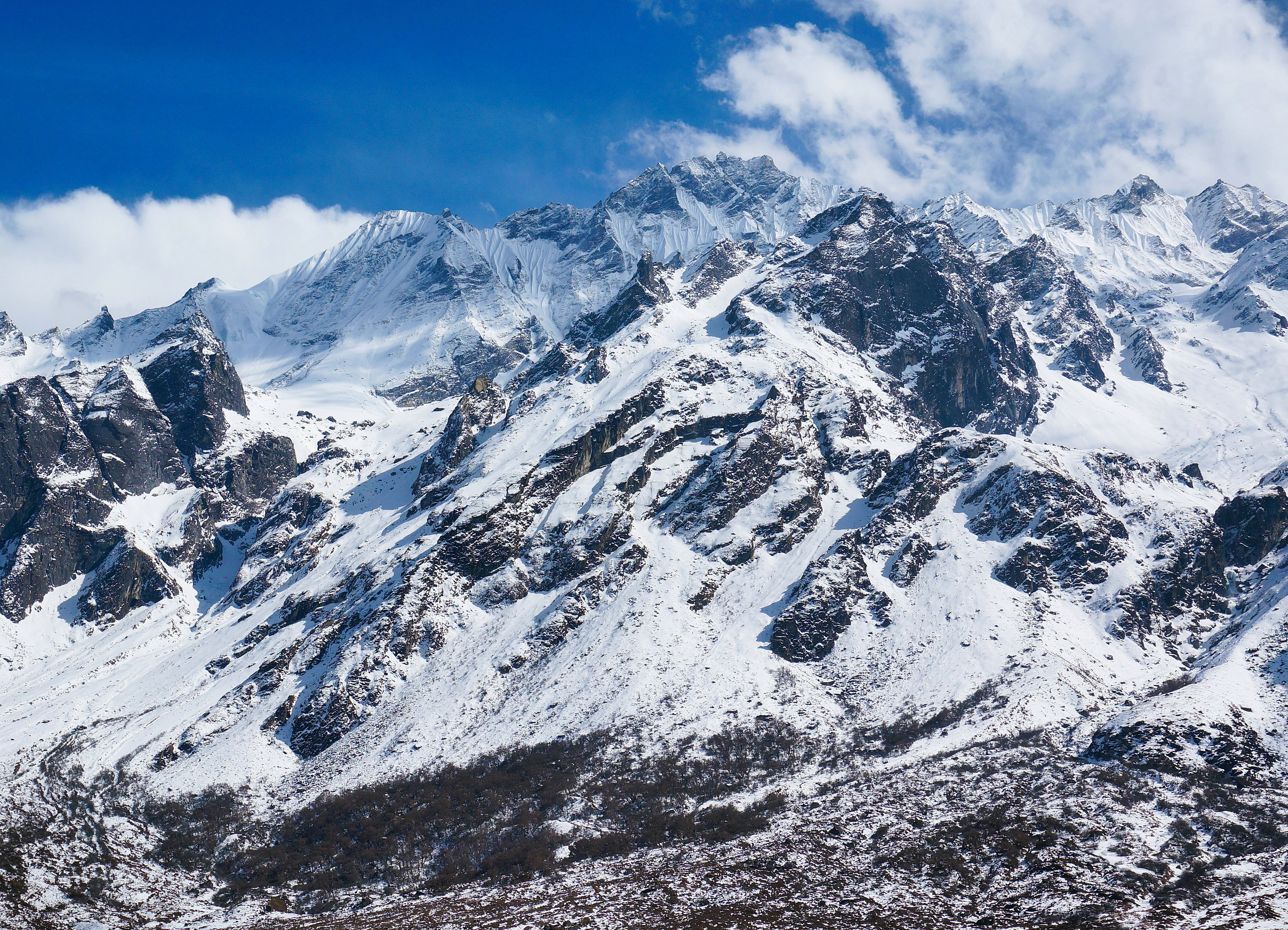
Northwest aspect

== See also ==
- Geology of the Himalayas
