= Ratna Chuli =

Mountain peak in Nepal/China

- Location within Nepal Location within Tibet Location within China

Highest point
- Elevation: 7,035 m (23,081 ft) (Note: Another source states 7,128 m (23,386 ft).)
- Prominence: 903 m (2,963 ft)
- Isolation: 11.27 km (7.00 mi)
- Listing: Mountains of Nepal; Mountains of China
- Coordinates: 28°51′52″N 84°22′38″E

Naming
- Native name: रत्न चुली

Geography
- Countries: Nepal and China
- Region: Tibet Autonomous Region (China)
- District: Manang (Nepal)
- Parent range: Himalayas

Ratna Chuli is a mountain peak in the Peri Himal mountain range on the border of Nepal and Tibet Autonomous Region. Ratna Chuli is 7,035 m (23,081 ft) above sea level and sits north-west of Manaslu.

== Climbing history ==
The first ascent was in 1996, by a team from Japan's Shinshu University and the Nepalese Police Mountaineering Foundation. The team ascended via the west ridge and put three groups of climbers on the summit on October 14, 16 and 18.
