= Tsar Tse =

Mountain in Nepal

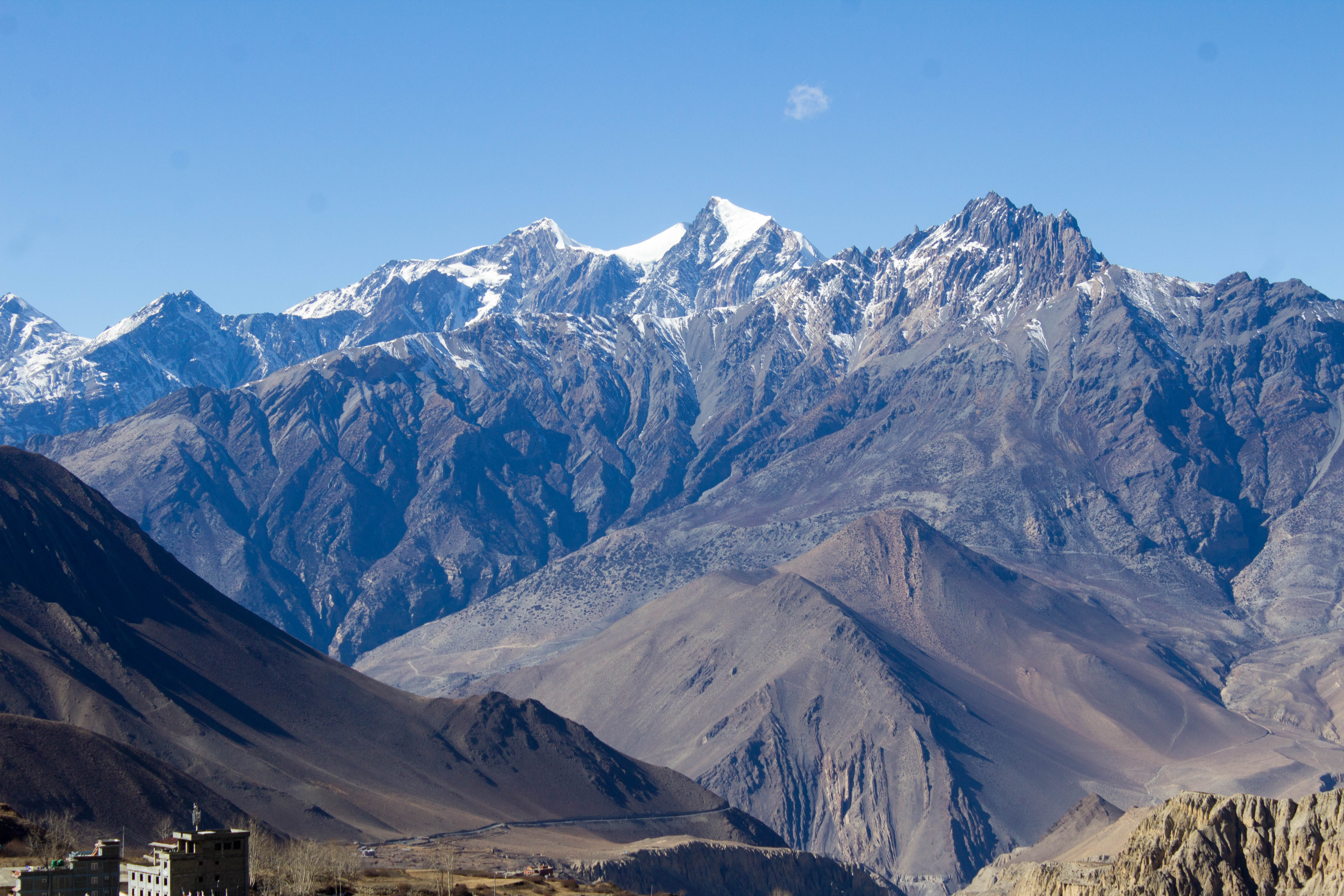
- East aspect centered on skyline

Highest point
- Elevation: 6,398 m (20,991 ft)
- Prominence: 402 m (1,319 ft)
- Parent peak: Tashi Kang
- Isolation: 1.85 km (1.15 mi)
- Coordinates: 28°51′41″N 83°38′55″E

Geography
- Location within Nepal
- Interactive map of Tsar Tse
- Country: Nepal
- Province: Gandaki
- District: Mustang
- Protected area: Annapurna Conservation Area
- Parent range: Himalayas; Mukut Himal

Climbing
- First ascent: 2018

Tsar Tse, also spelled as Tsartse or Tasartse, is a mountain in Nepal.

== Description ==
Tsar Tse is a 6,398-metre (20,991-foot) glaciated summit in the Nepalese Himalayas. It is situated 12 kilometres (7.5 mi) northwest of Jomsom in Gandaki Province and the Annapurna Conservation Area. Precipitation runoff from the mountain's slopes drains into tributaries of the Kali Gandaki. Topographic relief is significant as the summit rises 2,400 m (7,870 ft) along the south slope in 3.5 kilometres (2.2 mi), and the north slope rises 2,800 m (9,190 ft) in five kilometres (3.1 mi). The first ascent of the summit was made on September 25, 2018, via the southwest face by Koki Ikeda, Daisuke Shimozuru, Yujiro Suga, and Asahi Takeshita of Japan, with Dendi Sherpa, Ngima Sherpa, Penba Sherpa, Tenjin Sherpa, and Bir Kaji Tamang of Nepal.

== Climate ==
Based on the Köppen climate classification, Tsar Tse is located in a tundra climate zone with cold, snowy winters, and cool summers. Weather systems are forced upwards by the Himalaya mountains (orographic lift), causing heavy precipitation in the form of rainfall and snowfall. Mid-June through early-August is the monsoon season. The months of April, May, September, and October offer the most favorable weather for viewing or climbing this peak.

== Gallery ==
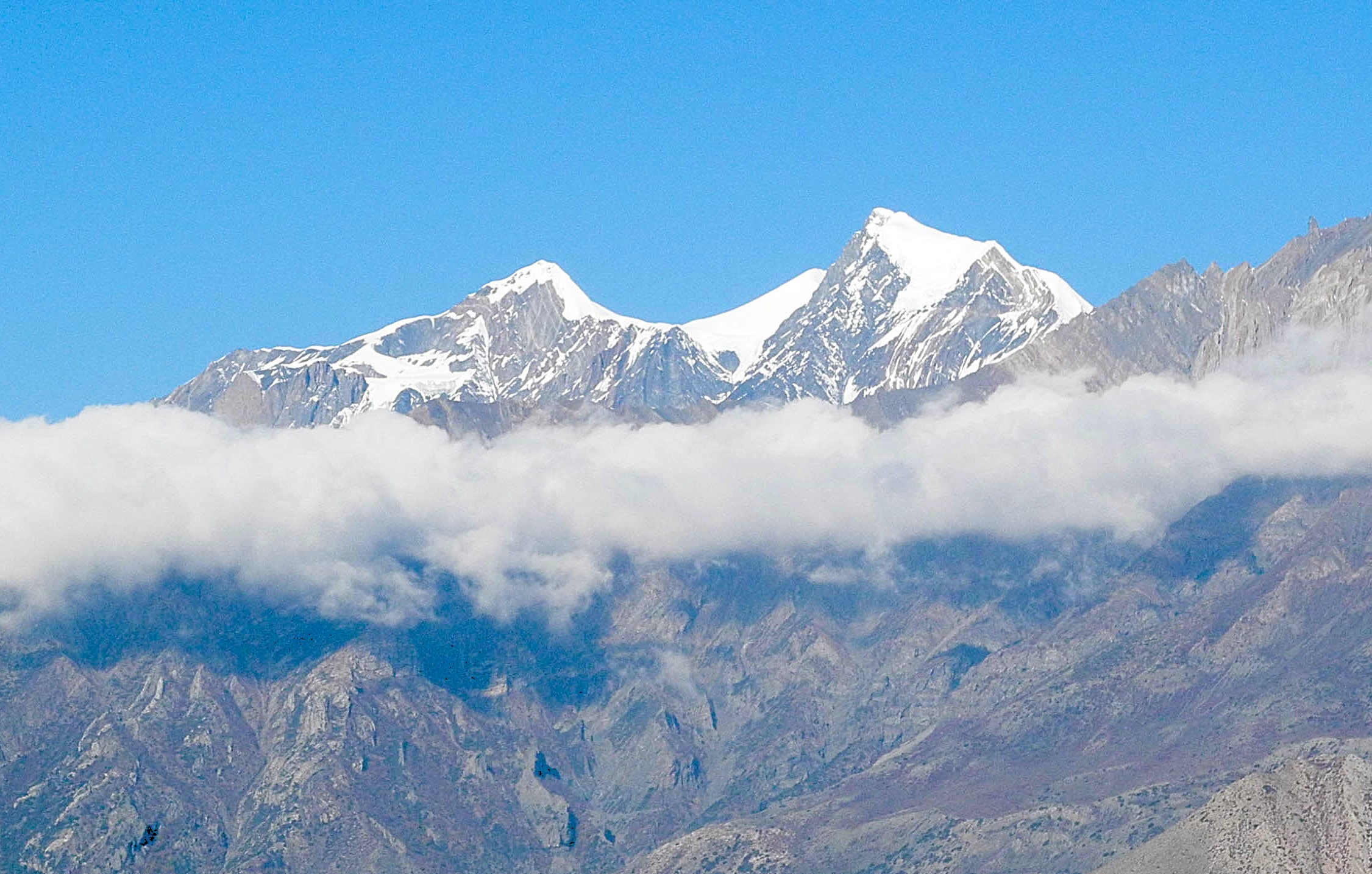
East aspects of Tashi Kang (left) and Tsar Tse (right)

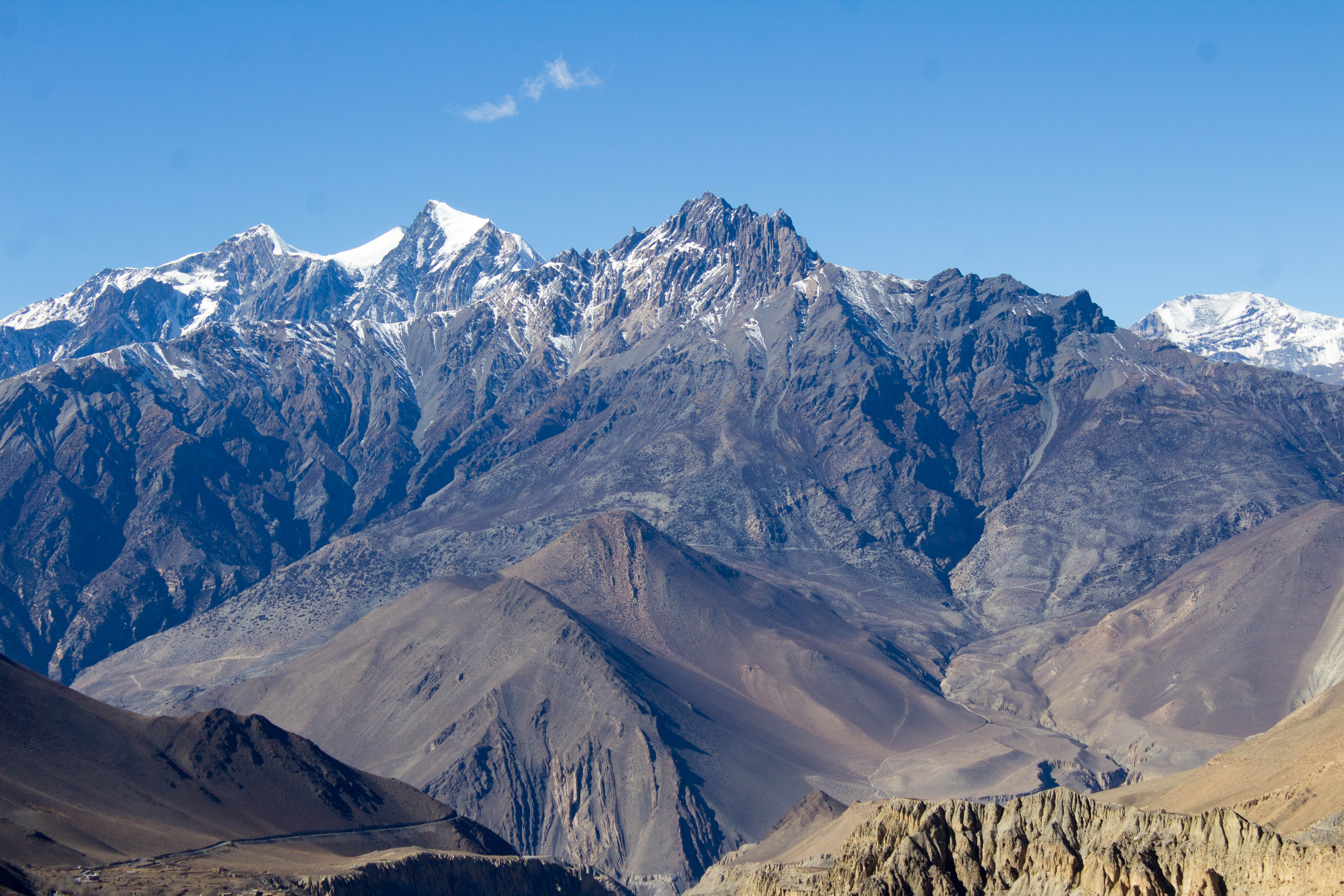
Tsar Tse left of center

== See also ==
- Geology of the Himalayas
