= Merra =

Mountain in Nepal

- Merrā
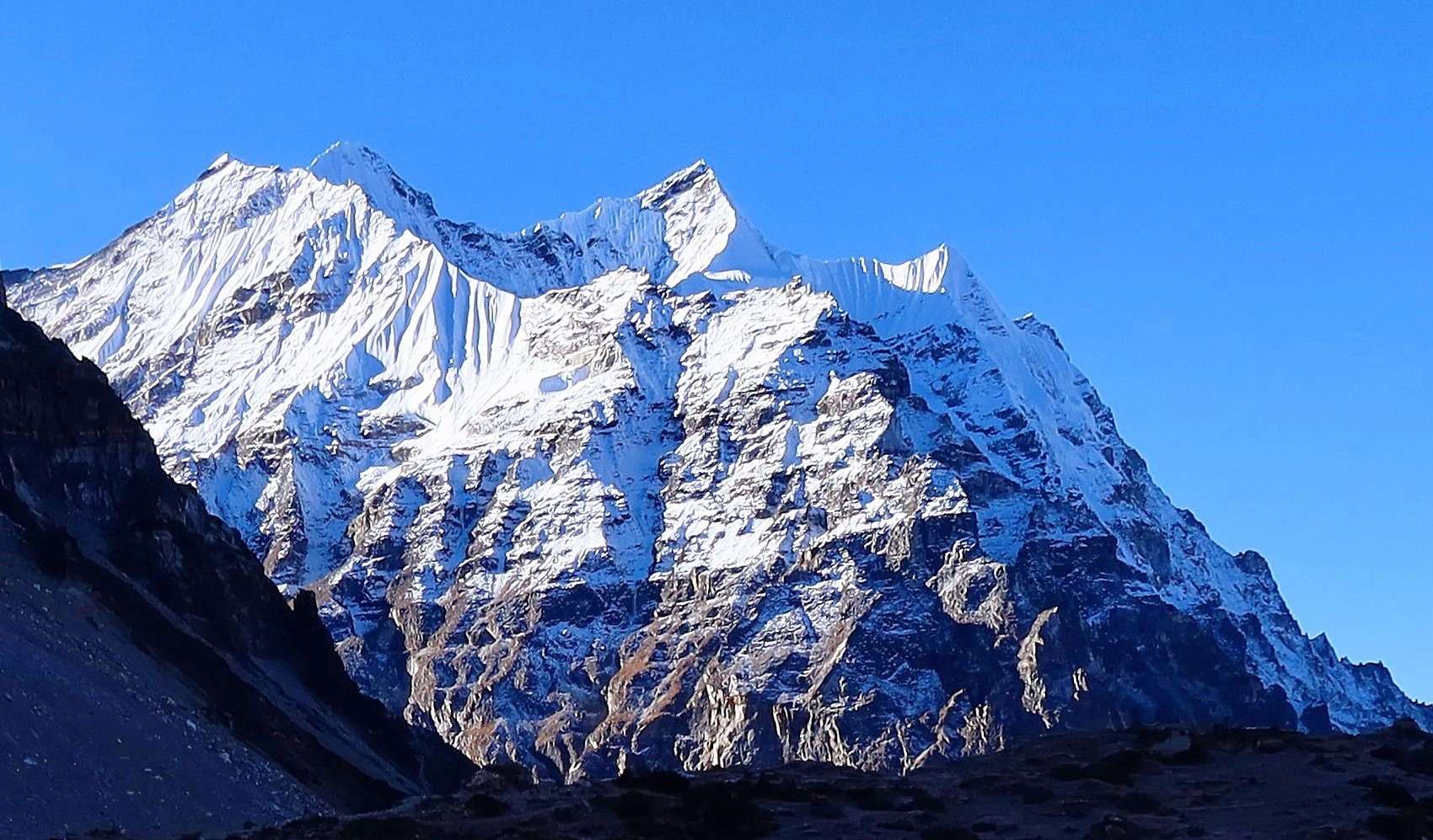
- North aspect

Highest point
- Elevation: 6,334 m (20,781 ft)
- Prominence: 454 m (1,490 ft)
- Parent peak: Jannu
- Isolation: 5 km (3.1 mi)
- Coordinates: 27°44′27″N 88°01′11″E

Geography
- Location within Nepal
- Interactive map of Merra
- Country: Nepal
- Province: Koshi
- District: Taplejung
- Protected area: Kanchenjunga Conservation Area
- Parent range: Himalayas

Climbing
- First ascent: 2006

Merra, or Merrā, is a mountain in Nepal.

== Description ==
Merra is a 6,334-metre (20,781-foot) glaciated summit in the Nepalese Himalayas. It is situated 13 kilometres (8.1 mi) west-northwest of Kangchenjunga in the Kanchenjunga Conservation Area. Precipitation runoff from the mountain's slopes drains into the Ghunsa River which is a tributary of the Tamur River. Topographic relief is significant as the summit rises 2,130 metres (6,988 ft) above the Ghunsa River in three kilometres (1.9 mi). The first ascent of the summit was made on October 18, 2006, by Claus Ostergaard.

== Climate ==
Based on the Köppen climate classification, Merra is located in a tundra climate zone with cold, snowy winters, and cool summers. Weather systems coming off the Bay of Bengal are forced upwards by the Himalaya mountains (orographic lift), causing heavy precipitation in the form of rainfall and snowfall. Mid-June through early-August is the monsoon season. The months of April, May, September, and October offer the most favorable weather for viewing or climbing this peak.

== Gallery ==
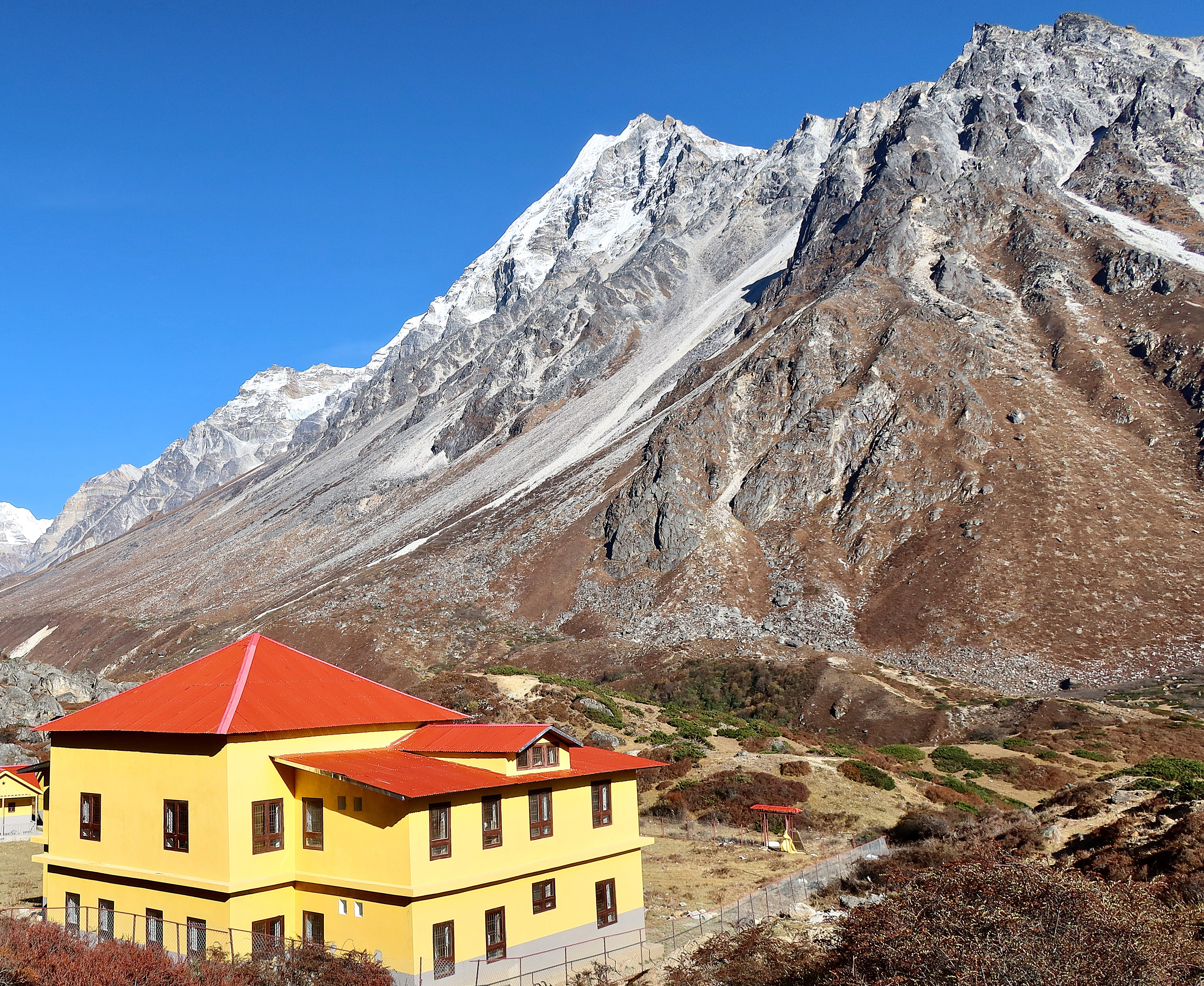
West aspect viewed from Khambachen

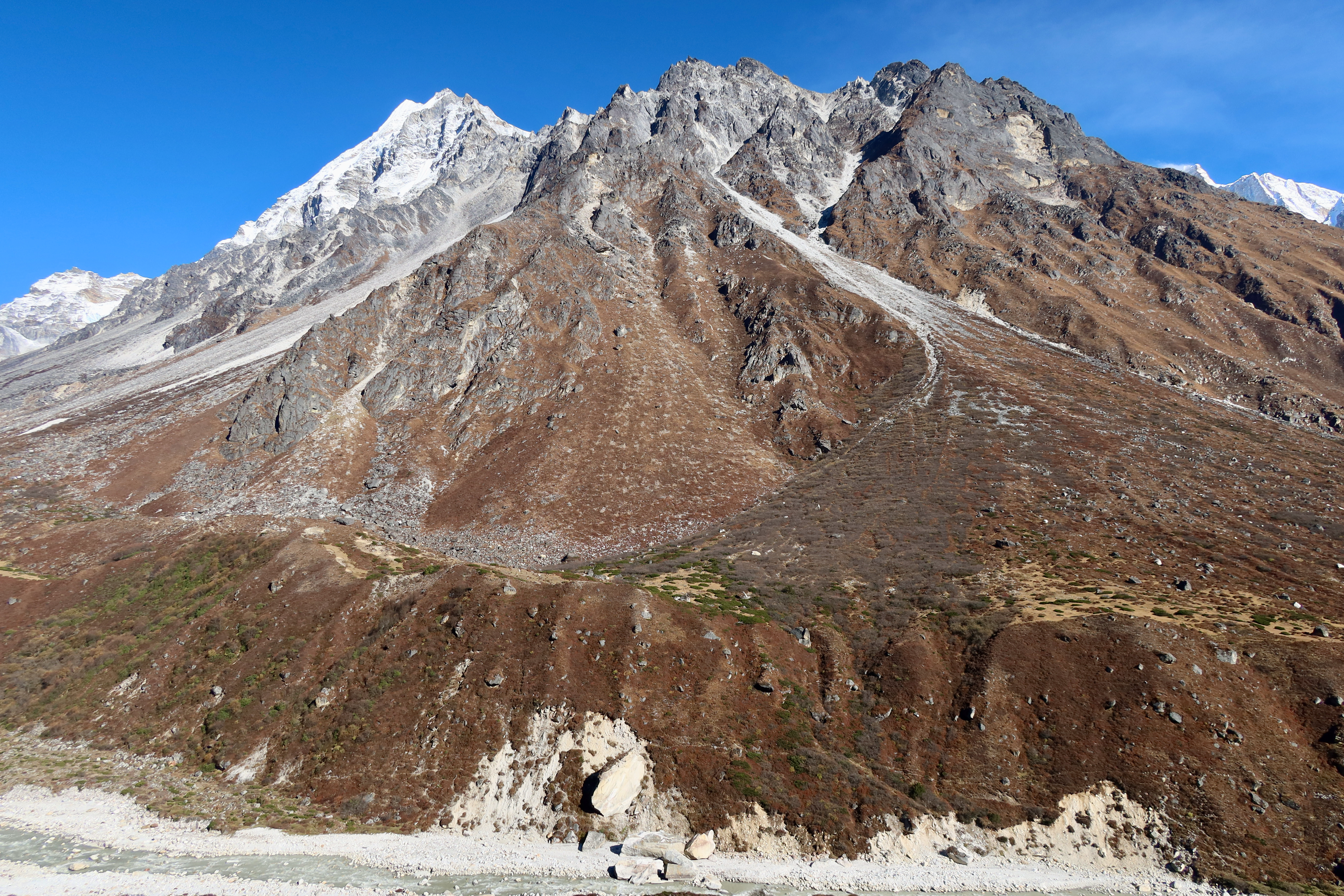
Lower west slope of Merra with Ghunsa River at bottom of frame

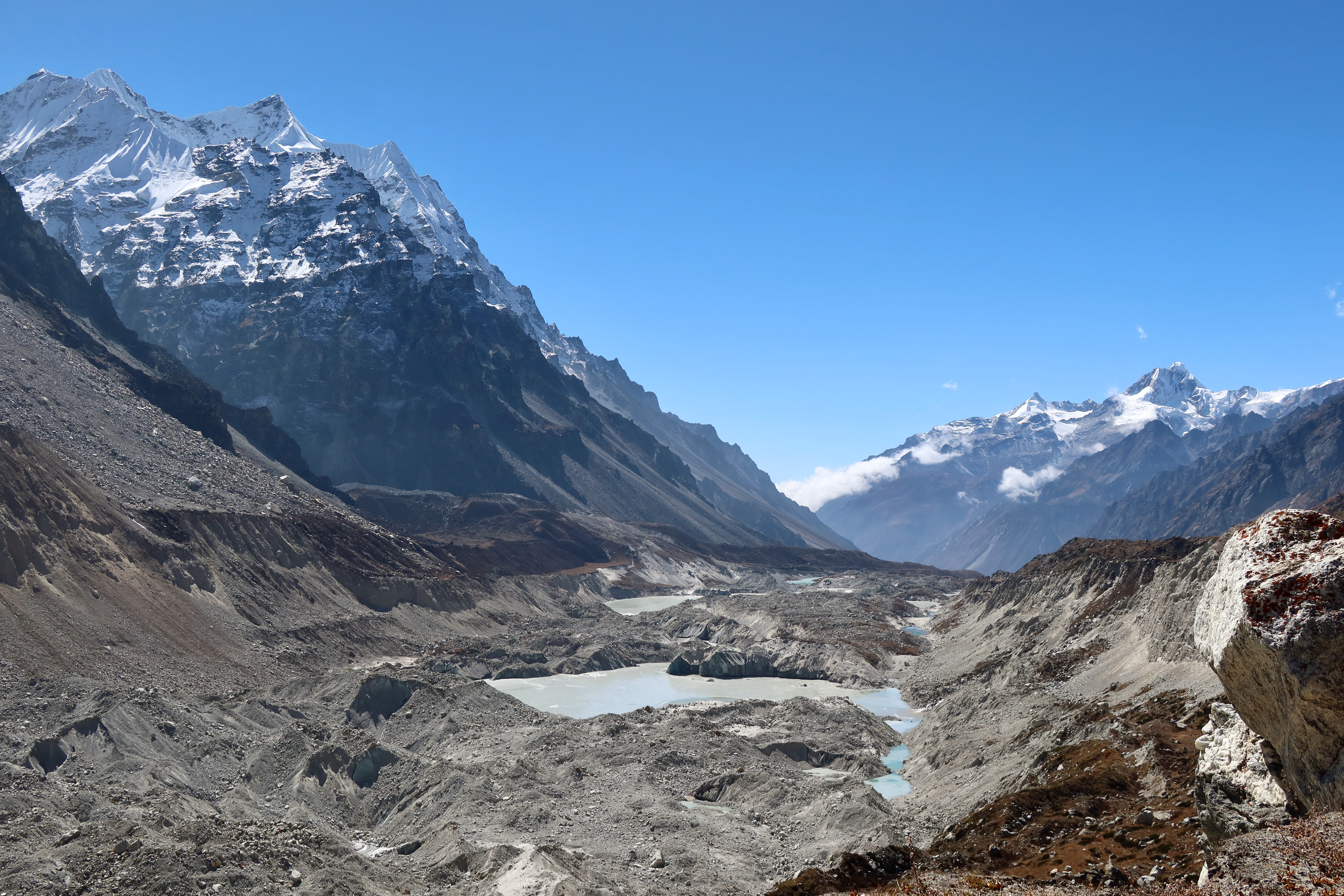
Merra in upper left, viewed with Kanchanjangha Glacier

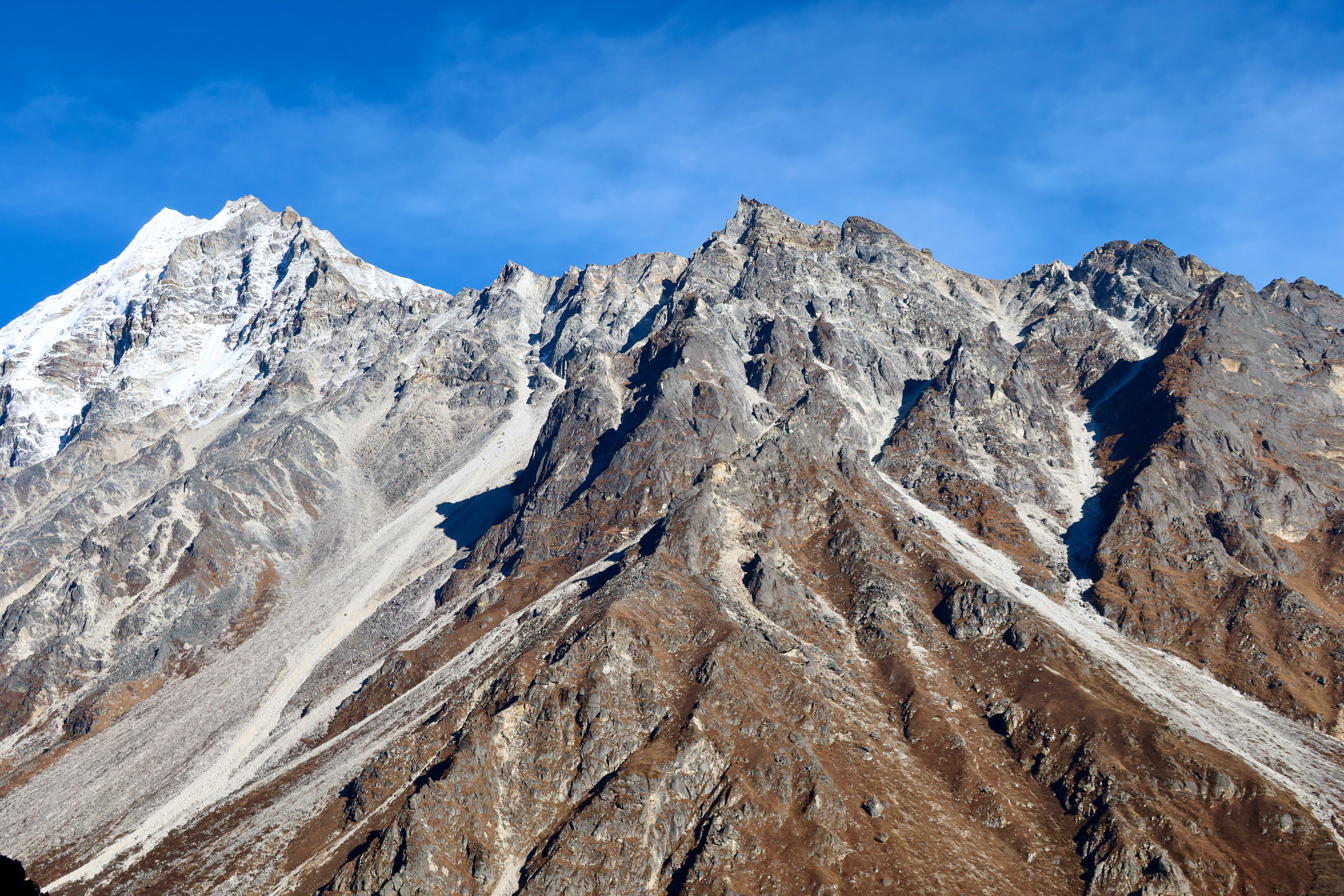
West slope

== See also ==
- Geology of the Himalayas
