= Bioresilience =

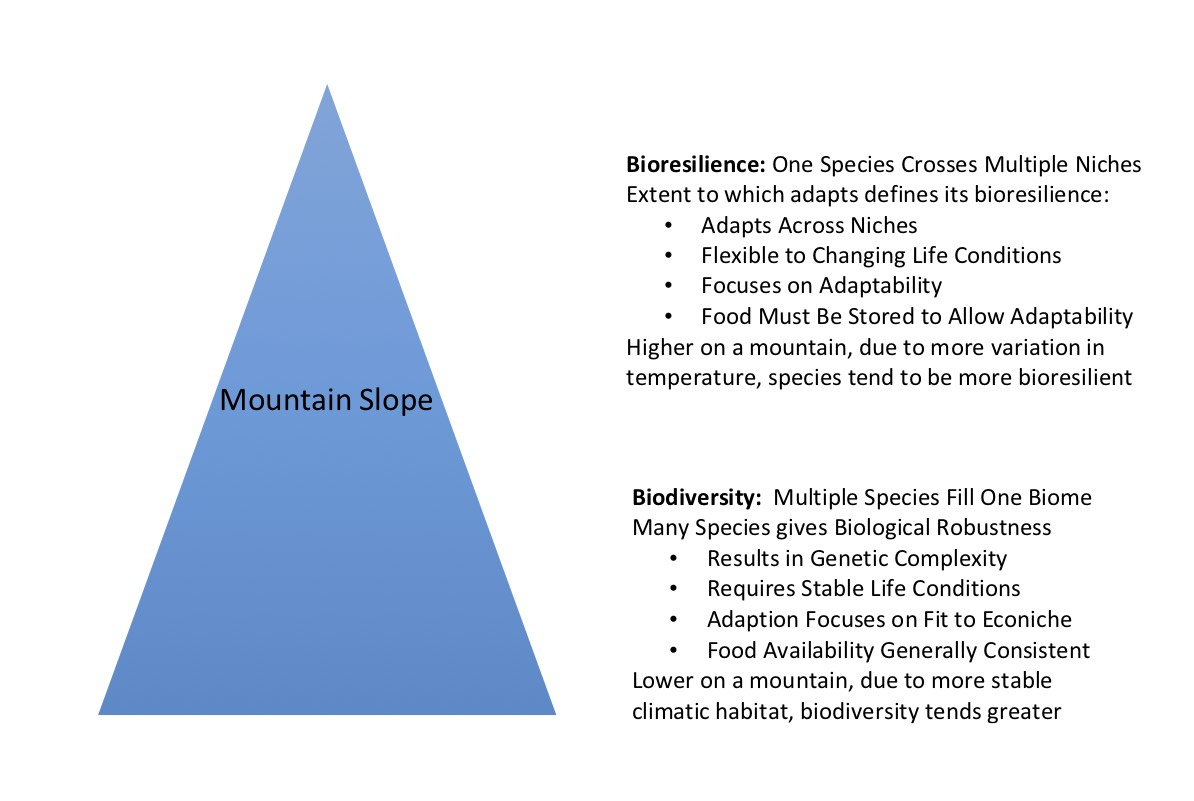
Comparing the features of bioresilience and biodiversity as found on a mountain slope

Bioresilience refers to the ability of a whole species or an individual of a species to adapt to change. Initially the term applied to changes in the natural environment, but increasingly it is also used for adaptation to anthropogenically induced change.

== History ==
Alexander von Humboldt was the first to note the resilience of life forms with increasing altitude and the accompanying decreasing prevalence in numbers, and he documented this in the 18th century on the slopes of the volcano Chimborazo.

Understanding of bioresilience evolved from research led by The Mountain Institute when establishing two of the national parks that surround Mount Everest, Makalu-Barun National Park in Nepal, and Qomolangma National Nature Preserve in the Tibet Autonomous Region of China. The research documented greater biodiversity at Everest's base than higher up. There were progressively fewer documented species as the mountain ascended into higher biomes, from subtropical to temperate to alpine to Arctic-like. These fewer species, though, had greater biological robustness correlating directly with increasing bioresilience.

== Current research ==
Monitoring of bioresilience, beginning in the Everest ecosystem but expanding to other mountain ecologies globally is being carried out by the Biomeridian Project at Future Generations University.

The concept of bioresilience has also been applied to human health to explain aging or chronic diseases decrease the ability of the body to adapt; In such cases, the system becomes rigid and unable to cross different life demands. As the human body loses robustness with age, an individual becomes unable to accommodate new life demands, be they contagions, stress, or events such as injury or even jet lag.

The importance of resilience in biological systems has been widely recognized in terms of the impacts on life by anthropogenic changes. Accelerating environmental change and continuing loss of genetic resources positions lower biodiversity around the planet threatening ecosystem services. A major mitigating factor will be life forms with higher resilience.

Paralleling the work in mountain environments, a growing number of studies are applying the concept of bioresilience to assess the robustness of life in other ecological systems challenged by the Anthropocene. One such study was with the adaptive renewal and natural perturbation in Lake Victoria, the world's second largest freshwater lake.
