= Yansa Tsenji =

Mountain in Nepal and China

- Dhagpache
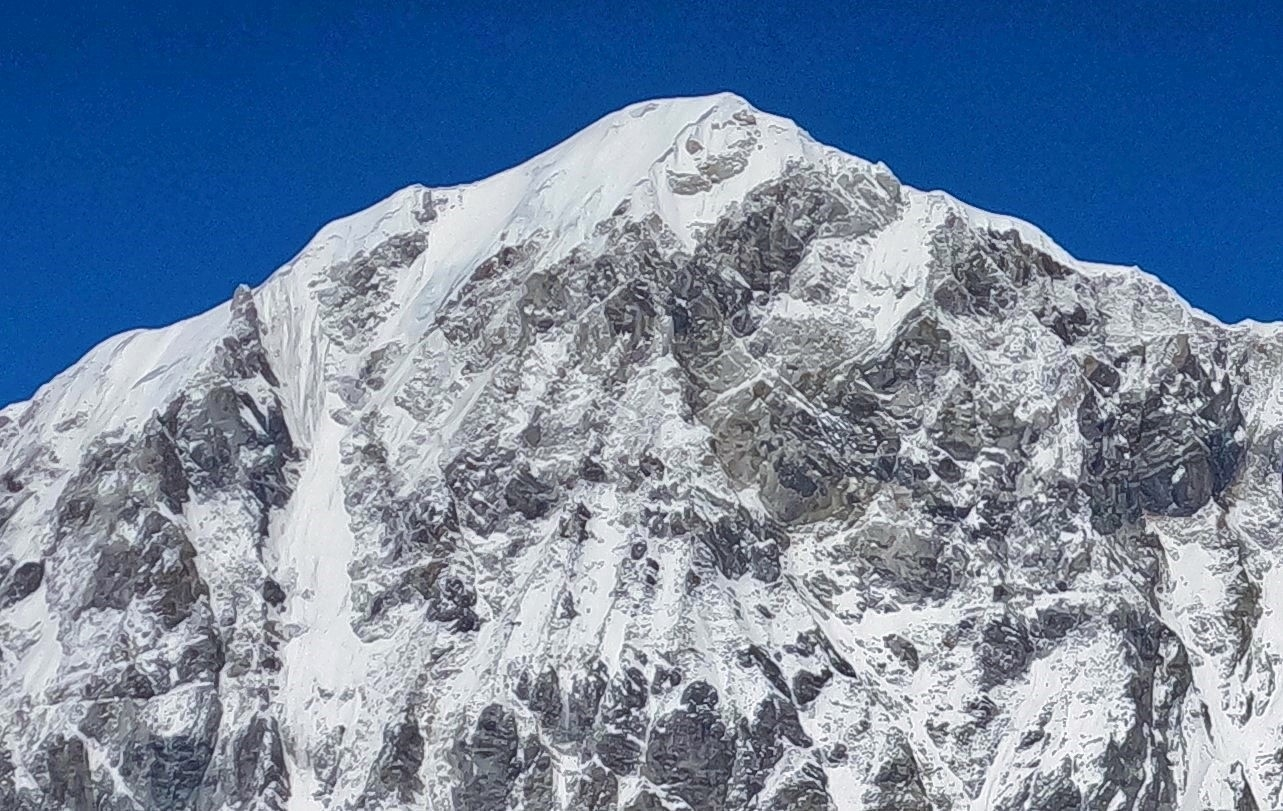
- Southeast aspect

Highest point
- Elevation: 6,567 m (21,545 ft)
- Prominence: 475 m (1,558 ft)
- Parent peak: Shalbachum
- Isolation: 2.73 km (1.70 mi)
- Coordinates: 28°15′23″N 85°36′18″E

Geography
- Location within Nepal Location within Tibet Location within China
- Interactive map of Yansa Tsenji
- Location: China–Nepal border
- Countries: Nepal and China
- Province: Bagmati
- District: Rasuwa
- Protected area: Langtang National Park; Qomolangma National Nature Preserve
- Parent range: Himalayas; Langtang Himal

Climbing
- First ascent: 2023

Yansa Tsenji, also known as Dhagpache, is a mountain in Nepal and Tibet.

== Description ==
Yansa Tsenji is a 6,567-metre (21,545-foot) summit in the Himalayas on the China–Nepal border. It is situated 64 kilometres (40 mi) north-northeast of Kathmandu on the boundary shared by Langtang National Park and Qomolangma National Nature Preserve. Precipitation runoff from the mountain's slopes drains into tributaries of the Trishuli River. Topographic relief is significant as the summit rises 2,670 metres (8,760 ft) above the Langtang Valley in six kilometres (3.7 mi). The nearest higher peak is Shalbachum, three kilometres (1.9 mi) to the northeast. The first ascent of the summit was made on October 29, 2023, by Joshua Jarrín and Oswaldo Freire via a route they named Between Fairies and Unicorns. Variant spellings for this peak include Dāgpāche, Dogpache, Dragpoche, and Dhagpahe.

== Climate ==
Based on the Köppen climate classification, Yansa Tsenji is located in a tundra climate zone with cold, snowy winters, and cool summers. Weather systems coming off the Bay of Bengal are forced upwards by the Himalaya mountains (orographic lift), causing heavy precipitation in the form of rainfall and snowfall. Mid-June through early-August is the monsoon season. The months of April, May, September, and October offer the most favorable weather for viewing or climbing this peak.

== Gallery ==
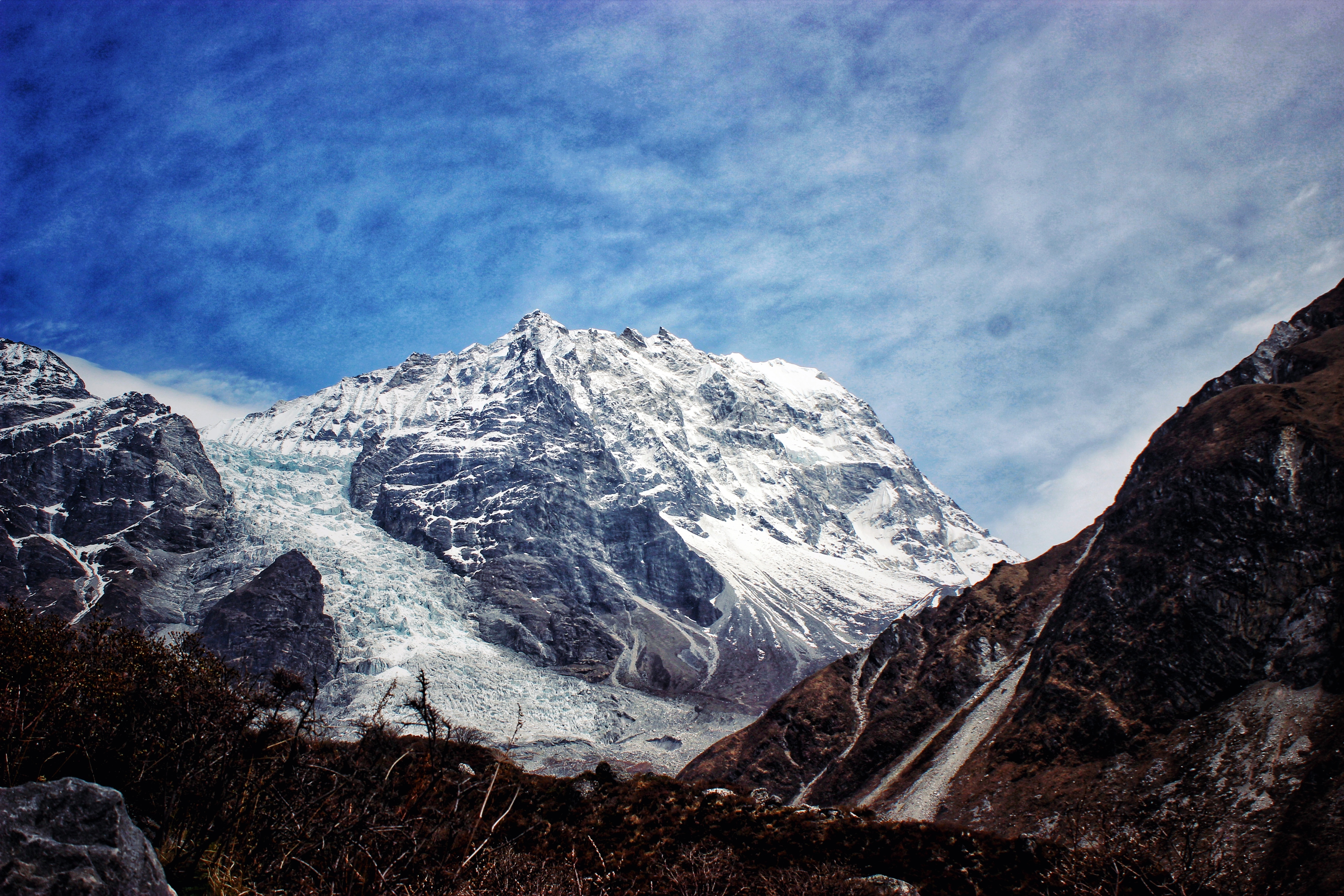
Southwest aspect

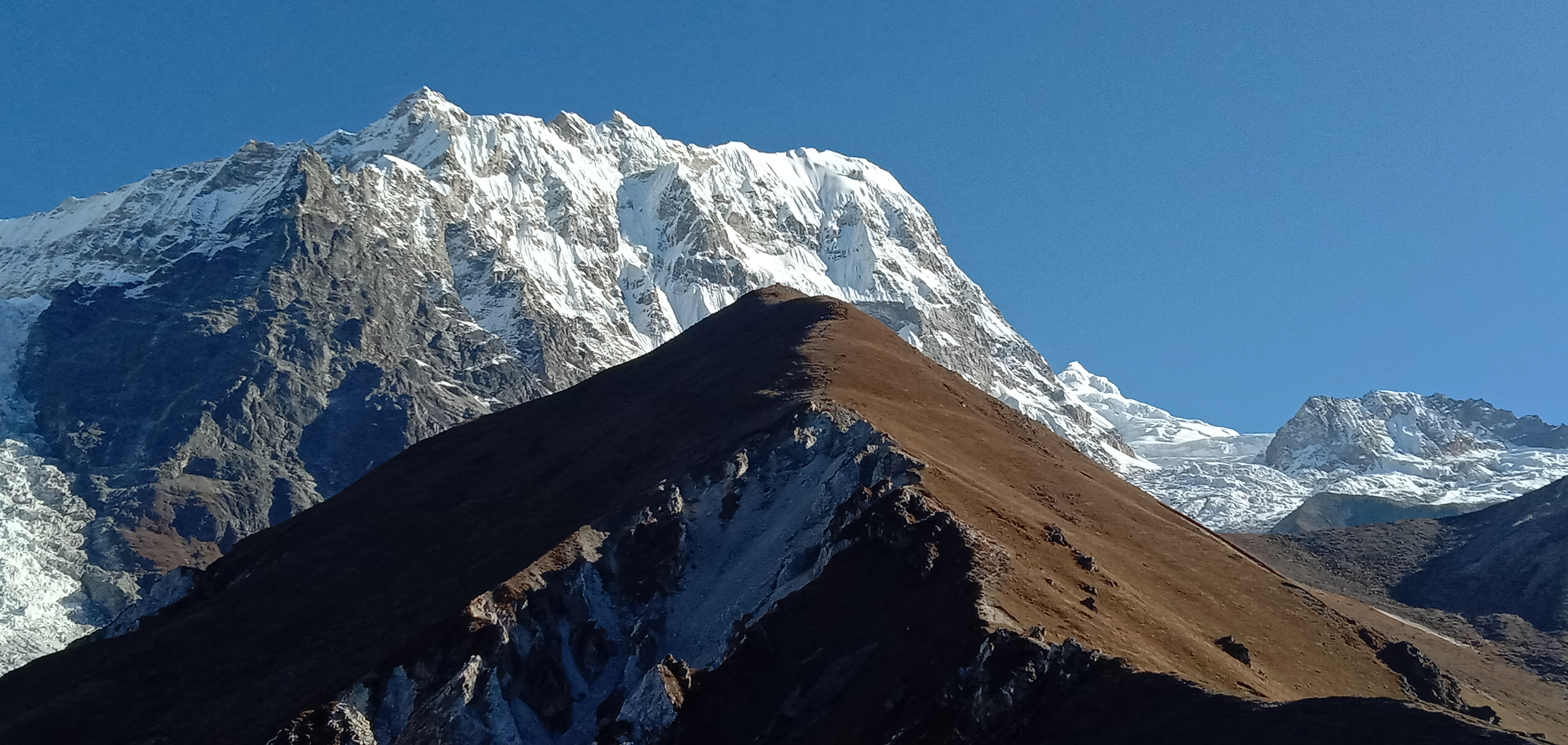
Southwest aspect

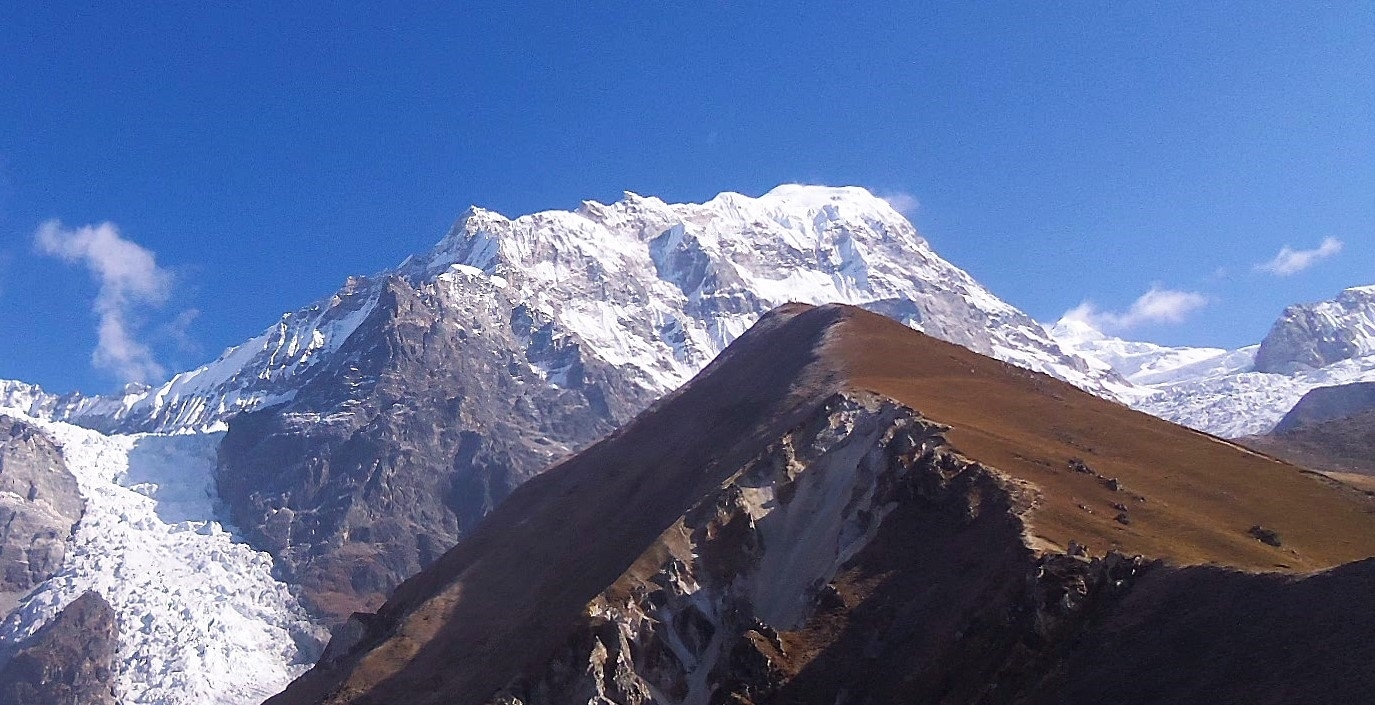
Southwest aspect

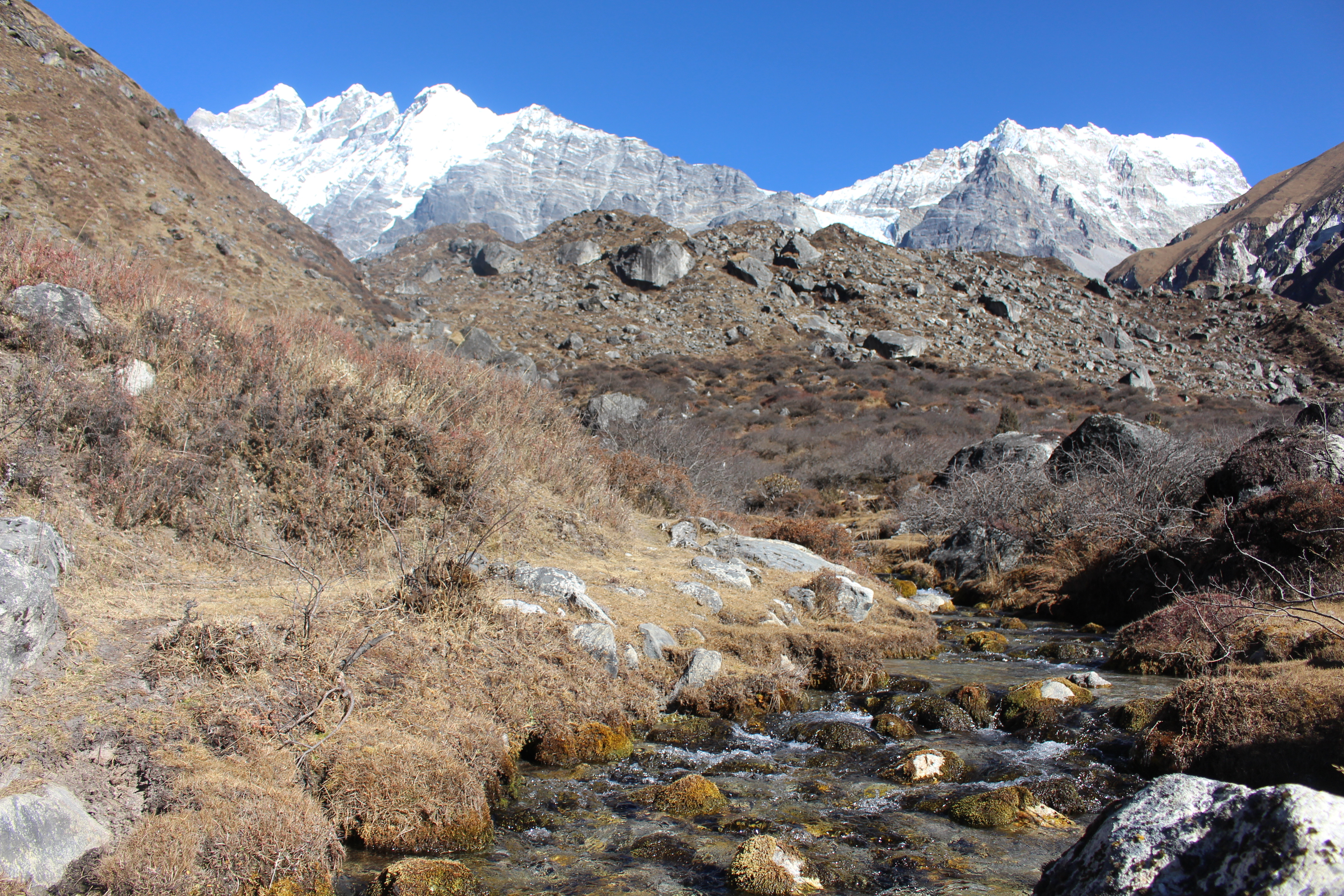
Yansa Tsenji in upper right corner

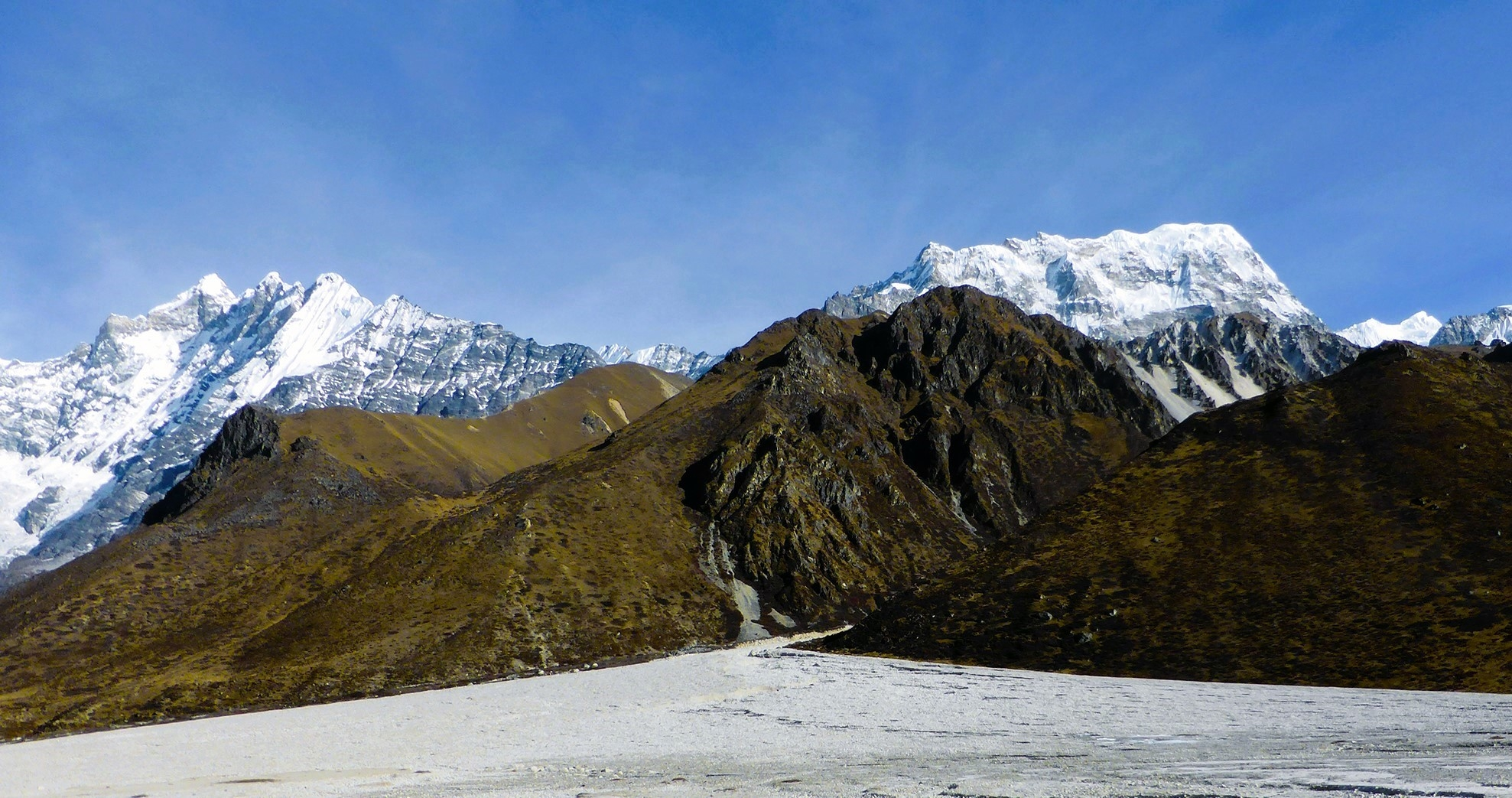
Tsangbu Ri (left) and Yansa Tsenji (right)

== See also ==
- Geology of the Himalayas
