= Lalu Wetlands National Nature Preserve =

Wetland in Lhasa, Tibet, China

Lalu Wetlands National Nature Reserve
- Lhasa Wetlands Nature Preserve
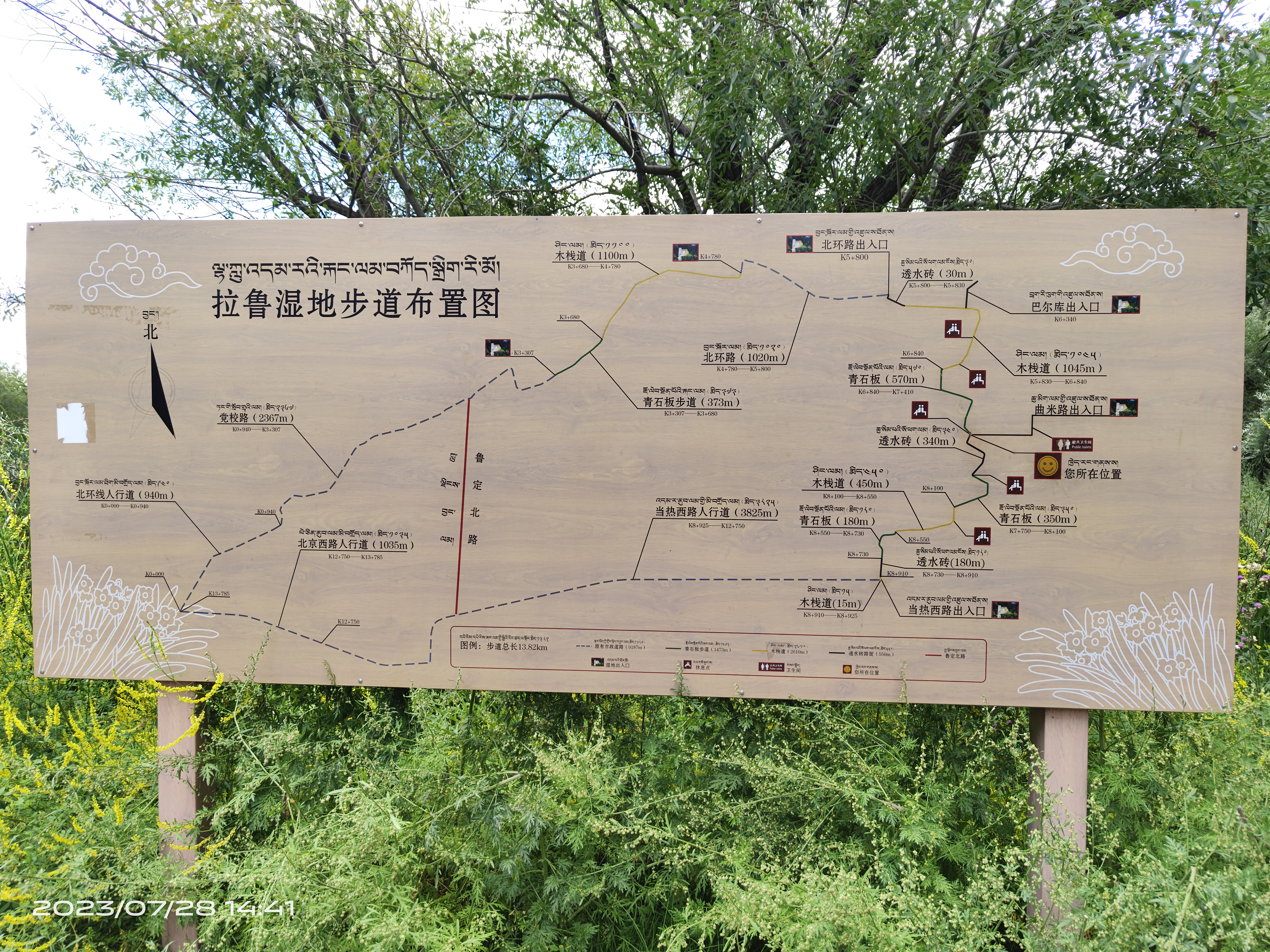

- Location within China
- Location: Lhasa, Tibet, China
- Coordinates: 29°40′20″N 91°05′27″E
- Area: 625 ha (1,540 acres)
- Established: 1994
- Website: web.archive.org/web/20140529224528/http://www.lalushidi.com/

Lalu Wetlands National Nature Reserve, also known as Lhasa Wetlands Nature Preserve, protects 625 hectares (1,540 acres) of wetlands in the center of Lhasa City, the capital of the Tibet Autonomous Region in the southwestern People’s Republic of China. The wetlands are completely surrounded by Lhasa, and constitute the largest urban park in the world and the largest urban wetlands in the world.

The preserve, initially created in 1994 as an urban park by the mayor of Lhasa with the support of his council, was subsequently made into a regional level preserve by the People’s Congress of the Tibet Autonomous Region in 1999, and then elevated to national protection status on July 25, 2005. This preserve is also recognized as being of international importance under the Ramsar Convention on wetlands.

== Physical aspects ==
At an elevation of 3,646 meters (11,962 feet) above sea level and protecting an area of 625 hectares (1,540 acres), these wetlands are typical of wetlands across the Tibetan Plateau, formed by impoundments of water into which first reeds (Phragmites sp.) grow then, as biomass builds up in the water with the advent of sedges, duckweed, (forming over time peat) also starts growing grasses and flowers such as Pedicularis sp. and gentians.

These wetlands are immediately north of the Potala Palace. They are bounded by the Gangdese Mountains to the east and the Lhasa River (Kyi Chu) to the west.

== Biological importance ==
The extensive wet area, with the river adjacent, has served as an excellent habitat for local and migratory waterfowl. These include the Ruddy shelduck, Bar-headed goose, Black-necked crane, Brown-headed gull, white stork, redshanks, as well as birds like Tibetan snow finch, hoopoe, wool leg sand grouse and a number of larks. Among mammalian life, species are mostly rabbits, rats, and an occasional fox.

Currently, the area’s biological importance focuses on education with a public visitors’ center, with walkways to take visitors appropriately into the wetlands, and with periodic educational programs for school children.

== History ==
That such extensive wetlands existed in this site served likely to be a stimulus for the original growth of Lhasa city as the humidity the wetlands provided in the narrow valley makes the otherwise dry air of Lhasa more moist than the surrounding Tibetan Plateau.

The wetlands historically covered about 10 square kilometres (3.9 sq mi), being the flat drainage area between the base of the Gangdise Mountains east of Lhasa City and the Lhasa River (Kyi Chu). A slightly raised northern riverbank prevented the water from directly draining to the river, and along this raised bank a series of structures were historically built—most notably the summer palace of the Dalai Lama the Norbulingka (Jewel Park). This holy retreat site having especially rich vegetation and unusually tall trees because of its better water supply due to underground seepage from the wetlands to the river.

As this city expanded in the 7th century both as a commercial and religious center, the need for additional land space which first went southward from the Potala Palace systematically then started to encroach on the wetlands area, especially with the advent of mechanical equipment that could easily fill in the wetlands and also dig trenches to drain the wet soil to the river.

As the city of Lhasa started to grow dramatically in the 1980s, at first this region was seen as accessible land (and hence rapid encroachment began). But by the 1990s the environmental costs to Lhasa were mounting with extensive garbage, polluted water, and a cement factory at the far northern terminus of the wetlands. It was noted that these wetlands were performing vital wastewater purification (a designation then was as the “kidneys of Lhasa") and also for their catchment of dust during the dust storms (5,500 tons of dust annually were estimated to be trapped), and the then Vice Governor of Tibet, Mao Rubai, a climatologist, started to publicly describe their moistening function to Lhasa’s air.

Initiating conservation action came from an American environmental worker, Chun-Wuei Su Chien, then in charge of China programs for the international nonprofit organization, Future Generations . Future Generations had been instrumental in setting up a community-based management system for the then first national nature preserve in Tibet, Qomolangma National Nature Preserve. Chien approached the Mayor of Lhasa, a review was conducted by the municipality with study visits led by Chien to community-based conservation projects in the United States looking at high altitude wetlands protection in places like Aspen Colorado, and then the president of Future Generations, Daniel C. Taylor, led a systematic planning endeavor with the city government.

Preliminary municipal designation occurred on May 25, 1995. Formal protection was implemented by the Tibet Autonomous Region Government in 1999. And national status on July 25, 2005. The detailed management ordinance was approved by the Ninth People’s Congress of the Tibet Autonomous Region on July 30, 2010.

== Management ==
The first vision by the mayor of Lhasa and the American environmental consultants (Chien & Taylor) from Future Generations was that this preserve would center on the children of Lhasa as an educational site. Added to this vision of preservation of the wetlands was the development of ‘‘linkas’’ for public picnic use (a long-standing and much-treasured Tibetan custom). As the preserve’s designation moved through the political processes of regional then national protection designation, in addition to a new road, also added was a traditional vertical fence to limit access especially by livestock.

Currently and into the foreseeable future, management of these wetlands is under the leadership of the Tibet Science and Technology Department.

Since the formal management ordinance of August 2010, the Preserve's 625 hectares (1,540 acres) has been sub-divided into three management zones. A core zone comprising 115 hectares (280 acres) is strictly protected; a buffer zone where limited use is permitted with educational and experimental foci comprises 221 hectares (550 acres); and a third area open for public use comprises an additional 339 hectares (840 acres).
