= Malangphutang =

Mountain in Nepal

- Malāṅphulāṅ
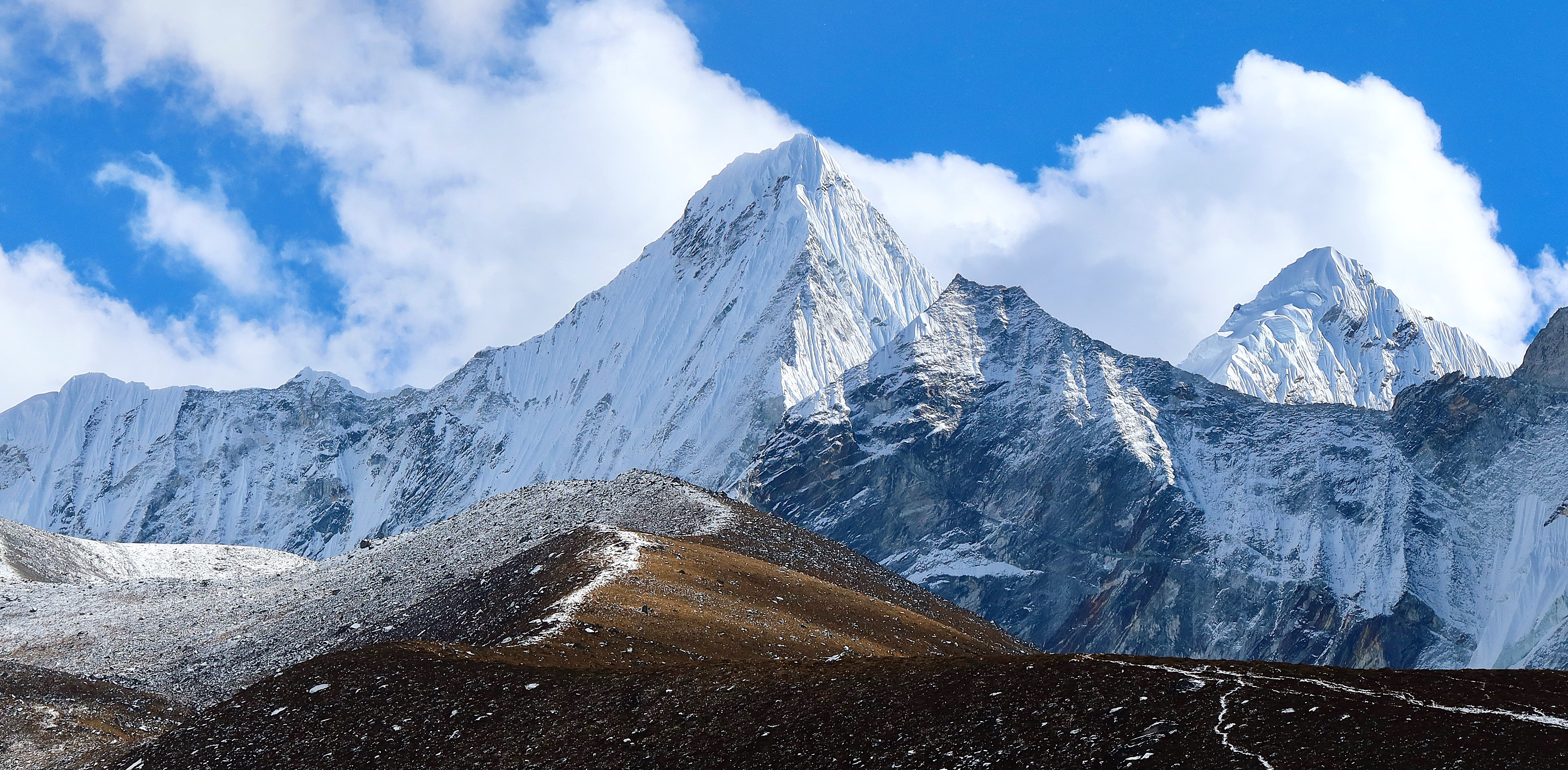
- Northwest aspect

Highest point
- Elevation: 6,573 m (21,565 ft)
- Prominence: 753 m (2,470 ft)
- Parent peak: Kangtega
- Isolation: 4.98 km (3.09 mi)
- Coordinates: 27°48′28″N 86°52′01″E

Geography
- Location within Nepal
- Interactive map of Malangphutang
- Location: Khumbu
- Country: Nepal
- Province: Koshi
- District: Solukhumbu
- Protected area: Makalu Barun National Park; Sagarmatha National Park
- Parent range: Himalayas; Mahalangur Himal

Climbing
- First ascent: 2000

Malangphutang, also known as Malāṅphulāṅ, is a mountain in Nepal.

== Description ==
Malangphutang is a 6,573-metre (21,565-foot) glaciated summit in the Nepalese Himalayas. It is situated six kilometres (3.7 mi) south of Ama Dablam on the common boundary that Sagarmatha National Park shares with Makalu Barun National Park. Precipitation runoff from the mountain's slopes drains into tributaries of the Dudh Koshi. Topographic relief is significant as the north face rises 1,400 metres (4,593 ft) in one kilometre (0.62 mi), and the west face rises 773 metres (2,536 ft) in 0.5 kilometre (0.3 mi). The first ascent of the summit was made on April 28, 2000, by Peter Carse and Amy Supy Bullard via the west face.

== Climate ==
Based on the Köppen climate classification, Malangphutang is located in a tundra climate zone with cold, snowy winters, and cool summers. Weather systems coming off the Bay of Bengal are forced upwards by the Himalaya mountains (orographic lift), causing heavy precipitation in the form of rainfall and snowfall. Mid-June through early-August is the monsoon season. The months of April, May, September, and October offer the most favorable weather for viewing or climbing this peak.

== Gallery ==
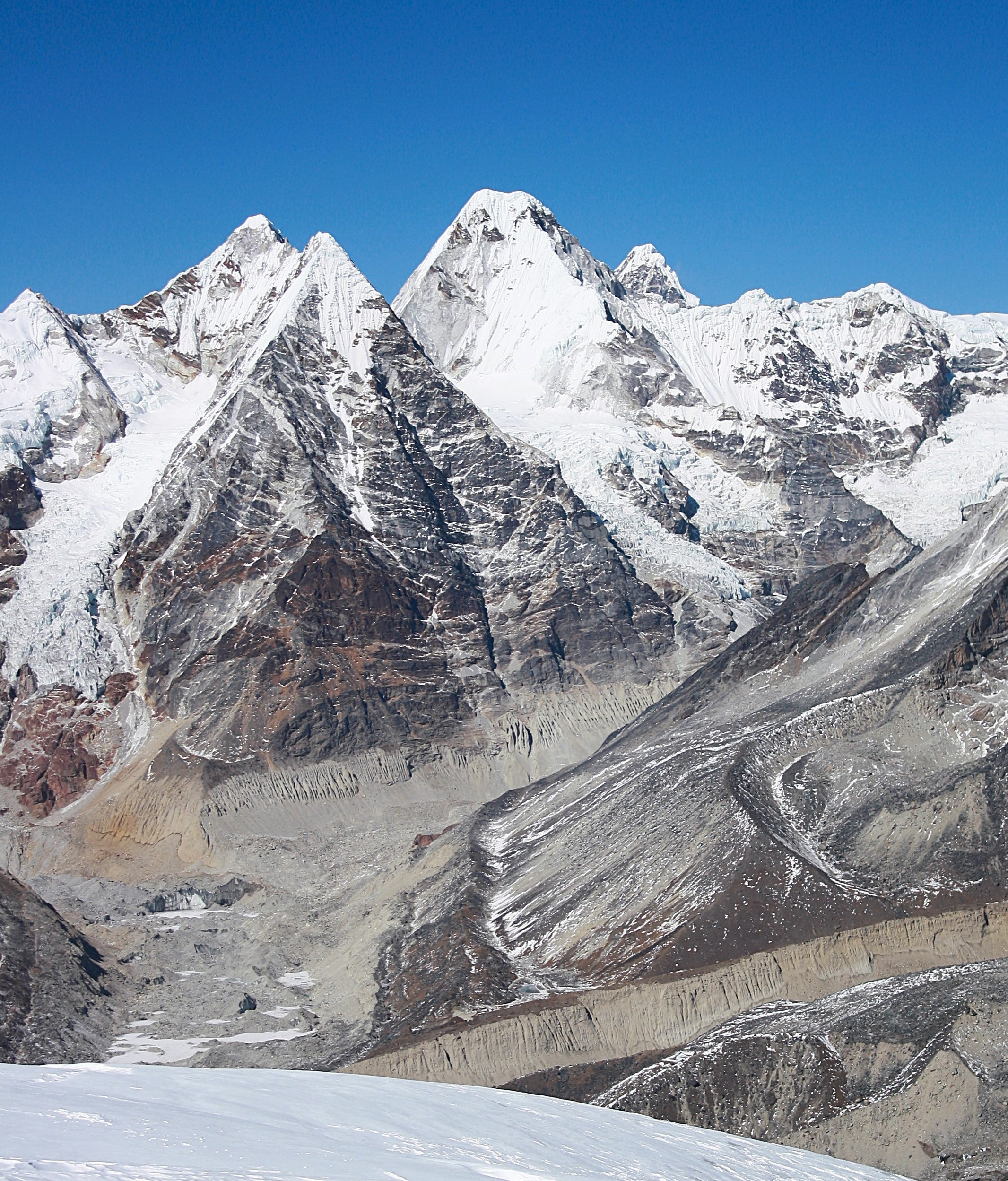
South aspect

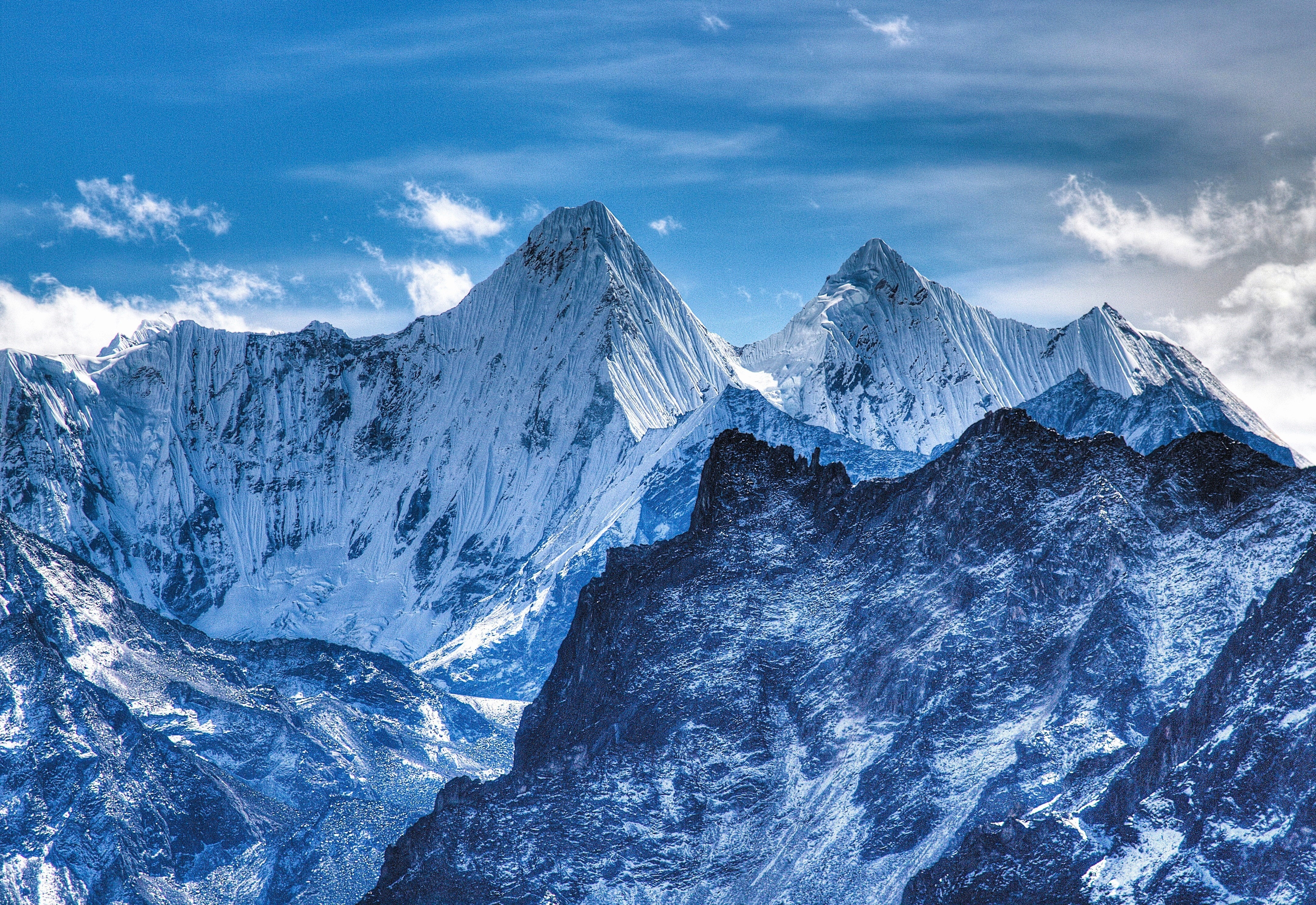
Malangphutang (left) and 6464 (right) from northwest

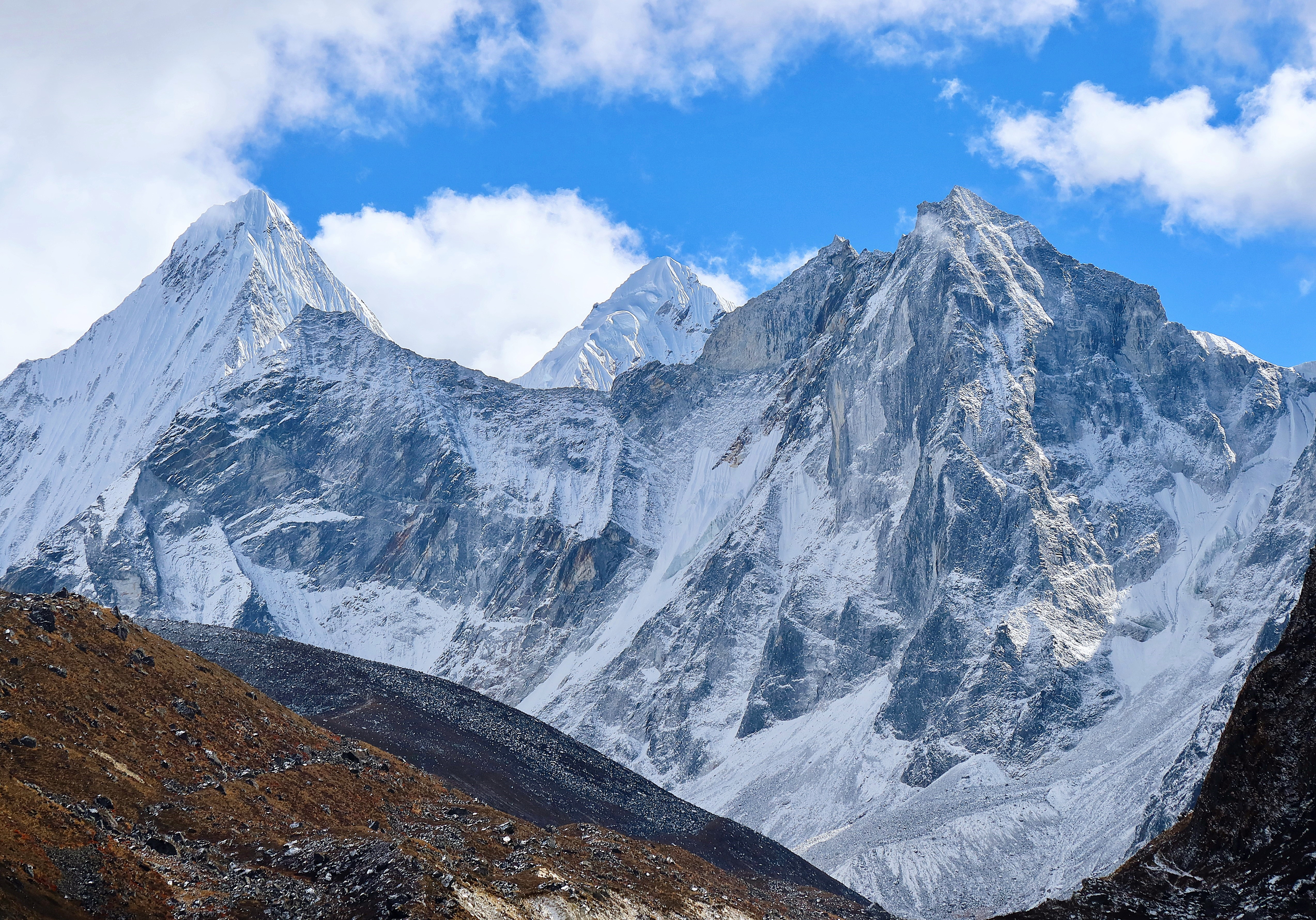
Malangphutang to left

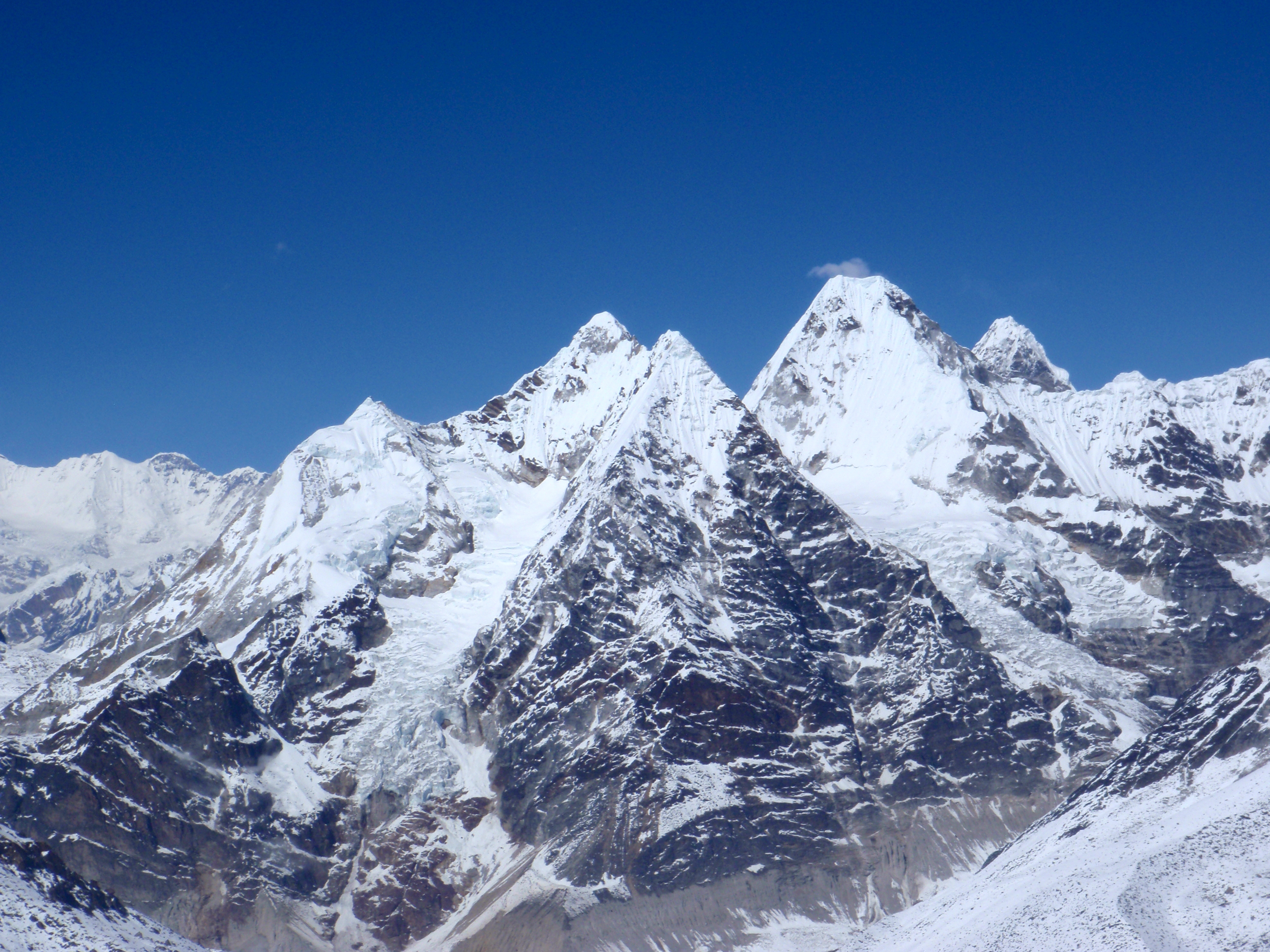
South aspect

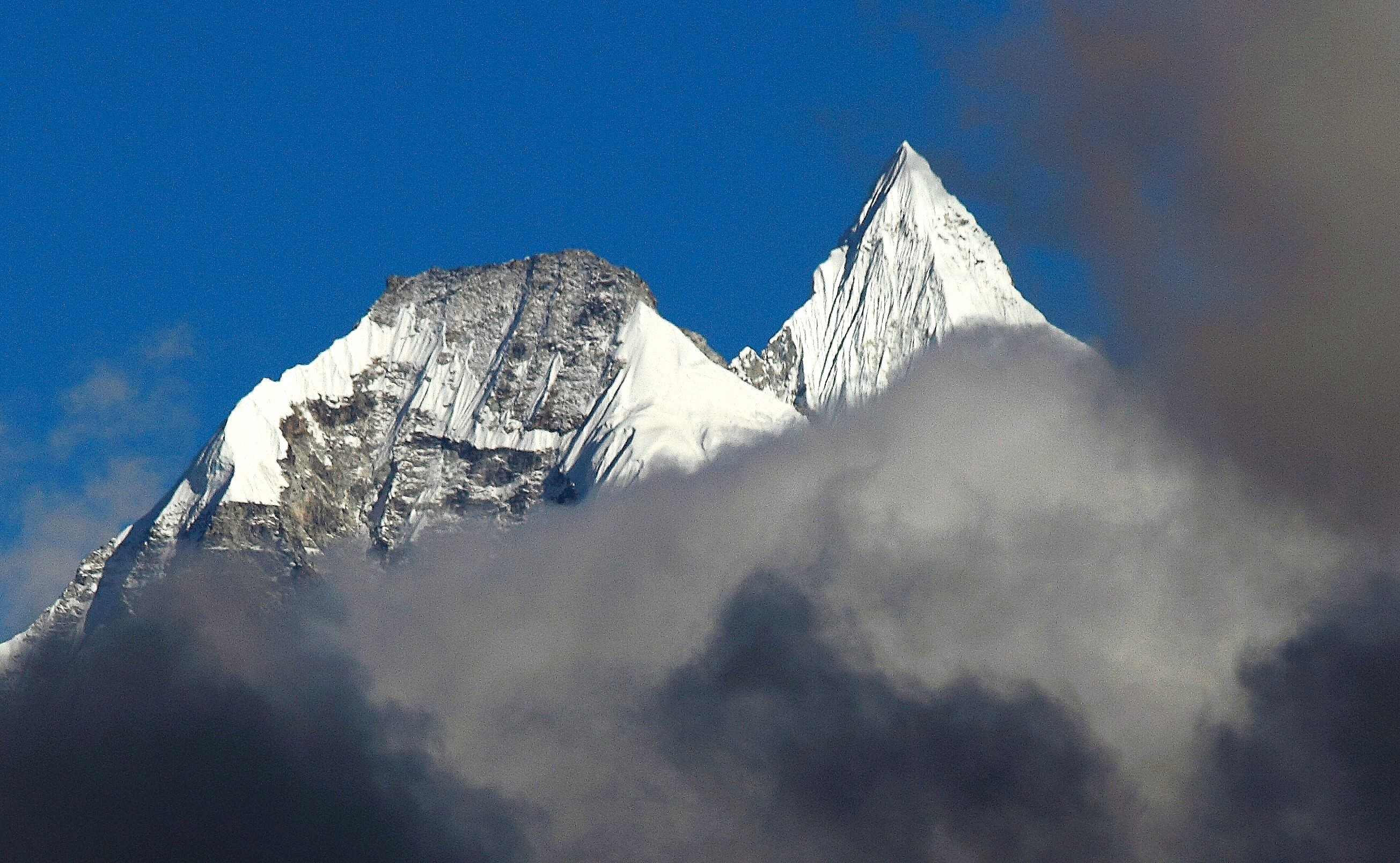
West aspect of Malangphutang (right) with Peak 6070 to left

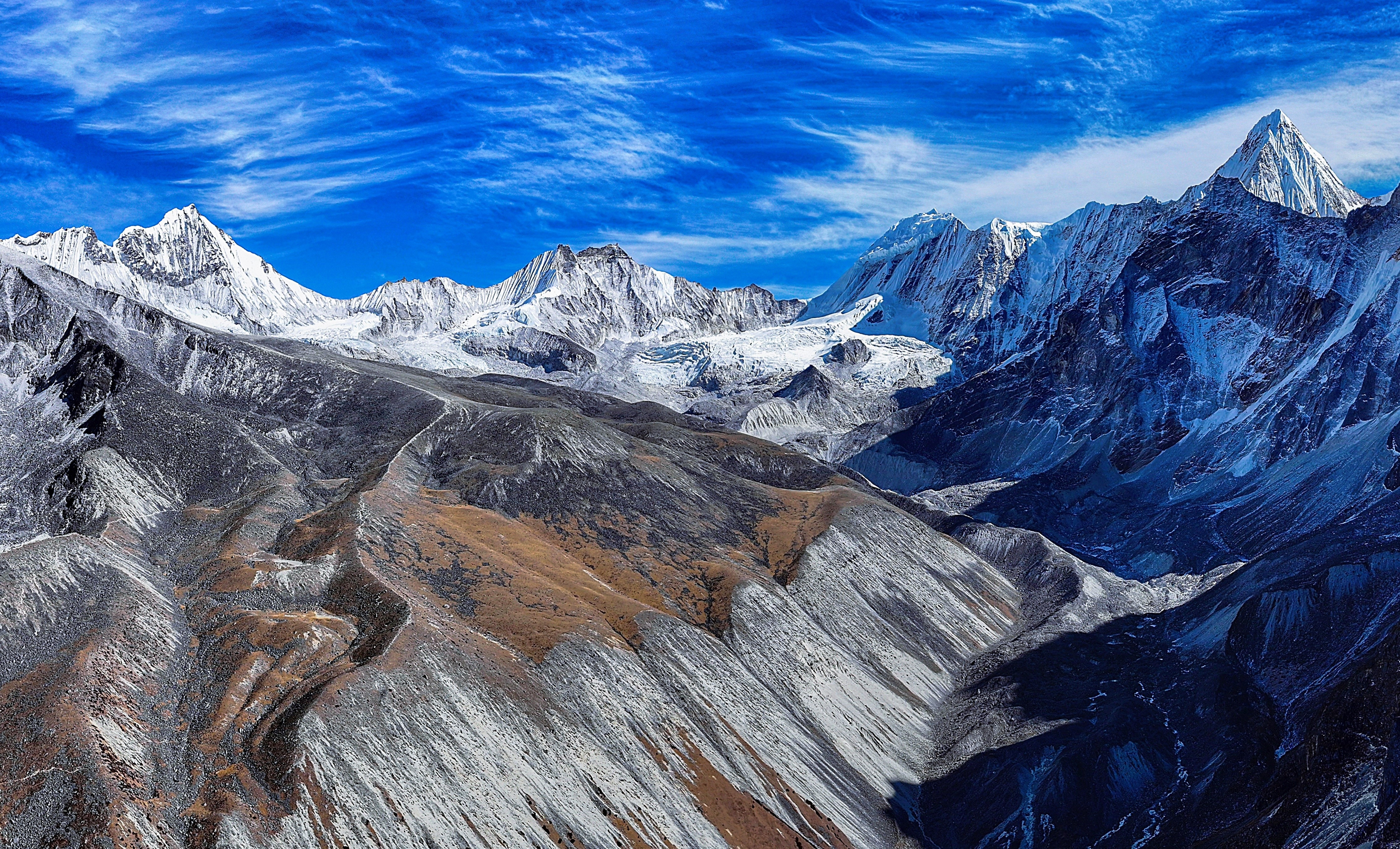
Ombigaichan (left) and Malangphutang (upper right) from the west

== See also ==
- Geology of the Himalayas
