= Future Generations University =

Graduate school in the United States

Coordinates: 38°42′33″N 79°24′20″W

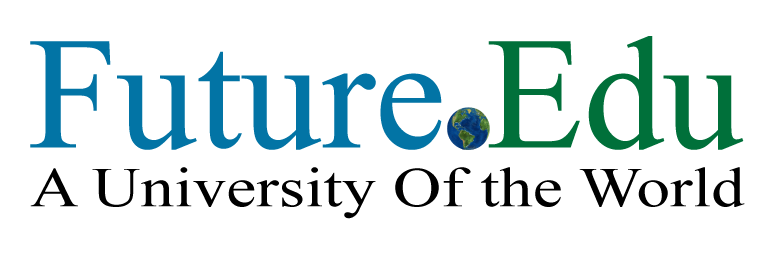
- Former name: Future Generations Graduate School
- Motto: Empowering Communities to Shape their Futures
- Type: Private online graduate school
- Established: 2003; 23 years ago
- Accreditation: Higher Learning Commission
- President: Daniel C. Taylor
- Location: Franklin, West Virginia, U.S.
- Website: www.future.edu

Future Generations University (formerly Future Generations Graduate School) is a private online graduate school headquartered in Franklin, West Virginia. It offers one degree program, a Master of Arts in Applied Community Development. Future Generations grew out of Future Generations, a non-governmental organization that began in the early 1990s in response to a UNICEF sponsored review of community-based initiatives worldwide.

== History ==
In 1992, James P. Grant, then executive director of UNICEF, asked Daniel C. Taylor, co-founder of The Mountain Institute, and his father Carl E. Taylor, founding chair of the Department of International Health at the Johns Hopkins Bloomberg School of Public Health, to investigate why there was no correlation between the amount of money that UNICEF invested in sustainable development projects and the output that the projects achieved. The main issue that UNICEF faced was that they had many successful projects in specific communities, but fell short when they attempted to scale them up.

The Taylors founded an NGO called Future Generations in November 1992 to address the questions of how to scale up local successes and how to sustain these successes using primarily local resources. They called the approach that they developed SEED-SCALE (Self Evaluation with Essential Data - Selecting Communities As Learning Examples). SEED-SCALE had three phases: (1) identifying a successful local project for social development; (2) transforming it into a community-based Action Learning Centre; and (3) a systematic process of facilitating community-to-community extension. SEED-SCALE fieldwork began in Tibet's Qomolangma National Nature Preserve. By 2012, Future Generations was working in China, Peru, India, Afghanistan, Canada, Haiti, and the United States.

In 2003, Future Generations Graduate School was formed to engage the global network of communities that Future Generations, the NGO, had become. The school would offer an applied master's degree for mid-career community development practitioners who work directly with communities, organizations, and governments worldwide.

== Academics ==
The institution offers only one degree, a Master of Arts in Applied Community Development. It also offers certificates and diplomas. Future Generations University is accredited by the Higher Learning Commission.
