= Ombigaichan =

Mountain in Nepal

Ombigaichen
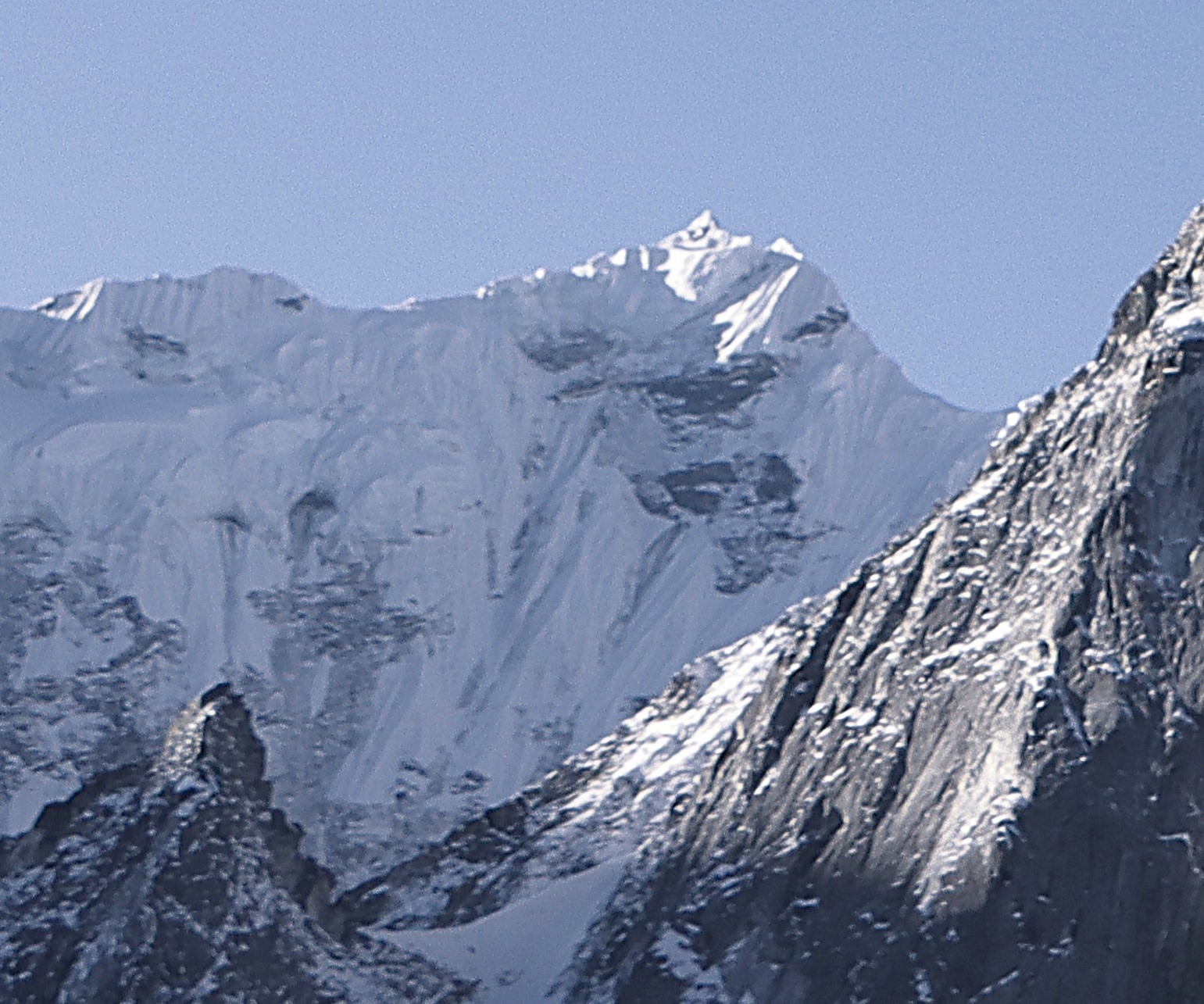
- North aspect

Highest point
- Elevation: 6,340 m (20,801 ft)
- Prominence: 310 m (1,017 ft)
- Parent peak: Ama Dablam
- Isolation: 1.08 km (0.67 mi)
- Coordinates: 27°51′11″N 86°53′00″E

Geography
- Location within Nepal
- Interactive map of Ombigaichan
- Location: Khumbu
- Country: Nepal
- Province: Koshi
- District: Solukhumbu
- Protected area: Makalu Barun National Park; Sagarmatha National Park
- Parent range: Himalayas; Mahalangur Himal
- Topo map: Sagarmatha (2786 04)

Climbing
- First ascent: 1960

Ombigaichen is a mountain in Nepal.

== Description ==
Ombigaichen is a 6,340-metre (20,801-foot) summit in the Nepalese Himalayas. It is situated 2.34 kilometres (1.45 mi) east-southeast of Ama Dablam on the common boundary that Sagarmatha National Park shares with Makalu Barun National Park. Precipitation runoff from the mountain's slopes drains into tributaries of the Dudh Koshi. Topographic relief is significant as the summit rises 1,000 metres (3,280 ft) along the north face in one kilometre (0.62 mi). The first ascent of the summit was achieved on November 18, 1960, by Jim Milledge and Ang Tshering Sherpa.

== Climate ==
Based on the Köppen climate classification, Ombigaichan is located in a tundra climate zone with cold, snowy winters, and cool summers. Weather systems coming off the Bay of Bengal are forced upwards by the Himalaya mountains (orographic lift), causing heavy precipitation in the form of rainfall and snowfall. Mid-June through early-August is the monsoon season. The months of April, May, September, and October offer the most favorable weather for viewing or climbing this peak.

== See also ==
- Geology of the Himalayas

== Gallery ==
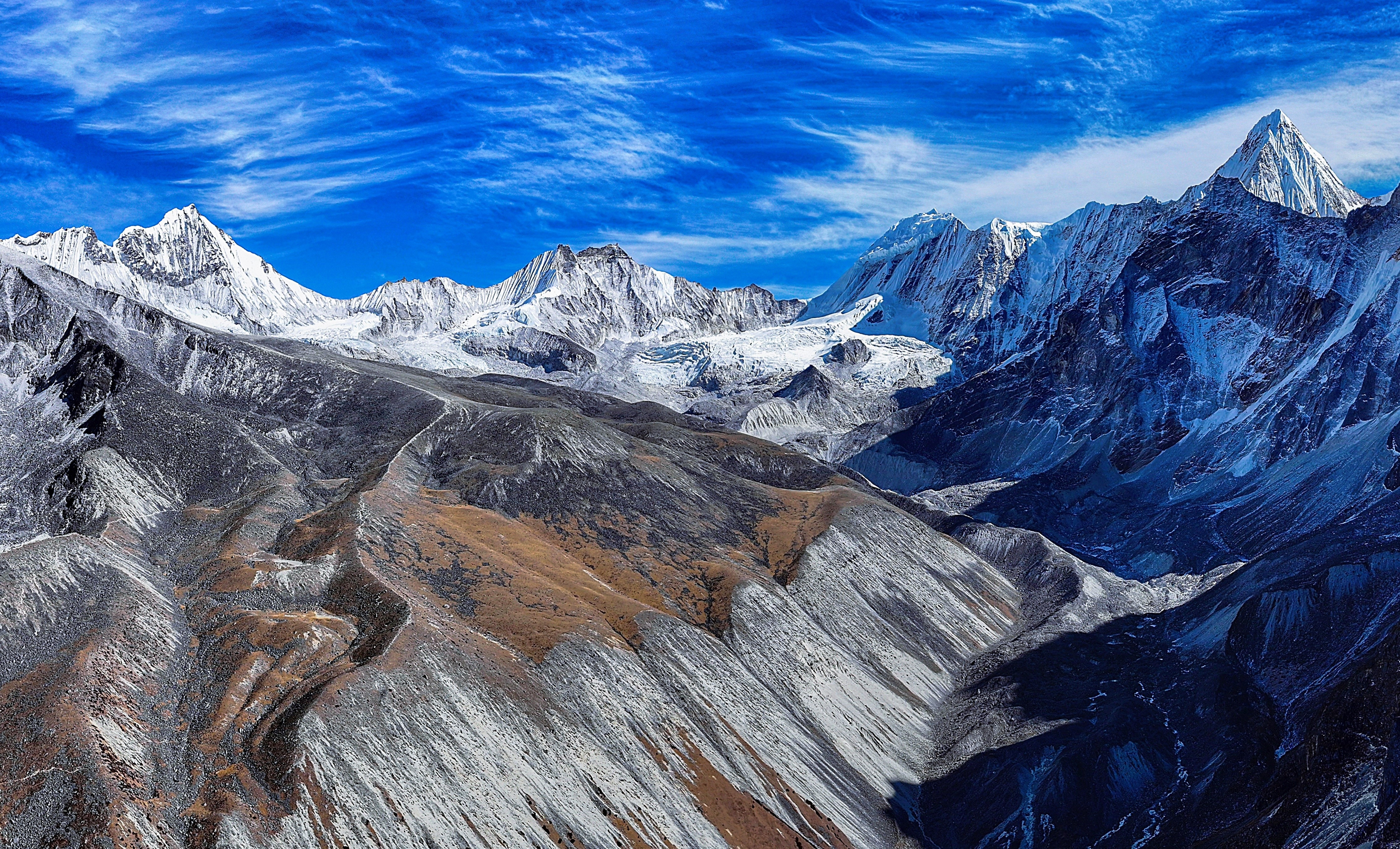
West aspect of Ombigaichan (left) and Malangphutang (right)
