= Daniel C. Taylor =

American scholar

Daniel C. Taylor (born June 26, 1945) is an American scholar, conservationist, educator, and author known for his work in community-based conservation, social change theory, and Himalayan ecological research. He also known for giving a definitive explanation for the century-old Yeti (or Abominable Snowman) mysteries.

He is former President of Future Generations University, which he founded. From 1993 to 2002, he was also a Senior Associate at Johns Hopkins Bloomberg School of Public Health.

He was knighted Suprabala-Gorkha-Dakshina-Bahu in Nepal in 1990, made the first Honorary Professor of Quantitative Ecology by the Chinese Academy of Sciences in 1995, and decorated with the Order of the Golden Ark by Prince Bernhard of the Netherlands in 2004.

== Works ==
His theoretical work on social change, SEED-SCALE, mentioned above by McKibben, was launched by then UNICEF Executive Director James P. Grant, resulted in a first major publication in 1995, a second in 2002, a third in 2012.), and a fourth in 2016

Bill McKibben encapsulates his work, “The most interesting development expert I’ve ever met is a West Virginian named Daniel Taylor …. His mantra, based on a series of principles called SEED-SCALE, goes like this: Forget big plans. Development is not a product, not a target, not some happy future state … it’s a process, measured not in budgets but in how we invest our human energy.”

In education, Taylor explored experiential education during his twenty years leading The Mountain Institute. With Future Generations University an accredited master's degree was started now extending to 40 countries.

Taylor pioneered a method for community-based conservation that protects areas first by using political boundaries then within environmental criteria creating management zones.

He integrated private land with public lands near Spruce Knob the summit of West Virginia. With the Green Long March in China, an environmental educational consortium was created with 50 Chinese universities.

In the Himalaya, his conservation works include trans-border conservation between China and Nepal with a seven million acre initiative around Mount Everest in Nepal the (Makalu-Barun National Park and adjoining in Tibet/China Qomolangma national nature preserve. In eastern Tibet Autonomous Region, he and co-worker Chun-Wuei Su Chien led in establishing the Lalu Wetlands National Nature Preserve in Lhasa, at 1,600 acres. This protected wetlands is now a region completely surrounded by Lhasa City. Additionally, he led in setting up a range of community conservation initiatives in Arunachal Pradesh, India.

For the mysterious Yeti tracks in Himalayan snows, after three decades of field research he showed by replicating enigmatic snow footprints with overprints by a tranquilized bear that ‘the abominable snowman’ was the Asiatic black bear (Ursus thibetanus).This can make an overprint of hind paw onto front creating a human-looking, bipedal-like snowprint.

In 2016, Taylor published his book Yeti: The Ecology of a Mystery that explained the Yeti footprint photographed by Eric Shipton in 1950. To complete this explanation, Taylor also located a never-before published photograph of that print that included proof of bear nail marks.

In 1972, he co-founded The Woodlands Institute (experiential education) that evolved into The Mountain Institute (mountain people and environments)In 1980, he co-founded Pendleton Community Care (comprehensive U.S. rural primary health care)

== Books published ==
- "Yeti: The Ecology of a Mystery" (New Delhi: Oxford University Press, 2017)
- “Just and Lasting Change: When Communities Own Their Futures, 2nd Edition” (Baltimore MD: Johns Hopkins University Press, 2016)
- “Mount Everest Guide to Off-road Driving”, (Franklin, WV: Forwards Press, 2014)
- Empowerment on an Unstable Planet: From Seeds of Human Energy to a Scale of Global Change, co-authors Carl E. Taylor, Jesse O. Taylor, (New York: Oxford University Press, 2012)
- CAIRNS: A Novel of Tibet, (For Words Press: Franklin, WV, 2011)
- Just and Lasting Change: When Communities Own Their Futures, Carl E. Taylor co-author, (Baltimore: Johns Hopkins University Press, 2002)
- Community Based Sustainable Human Development—Going to Scale with Self-reliant Social Development, co-author Carl E. Taylor, (New York: UNICEF, 1995).
- Something Hidden Behind the Ranges: An Himalayan Quest, (San Francisco: Mercury House, 1995)
- Population Education for Nepal, co-author Hem Hamal (Chapel Hill, NC: Carolina Population Center, University of North Carolina Press, 1973).
