= Shalbachum =

Mountain in Nepal and China

- Phrul Rangien Ri
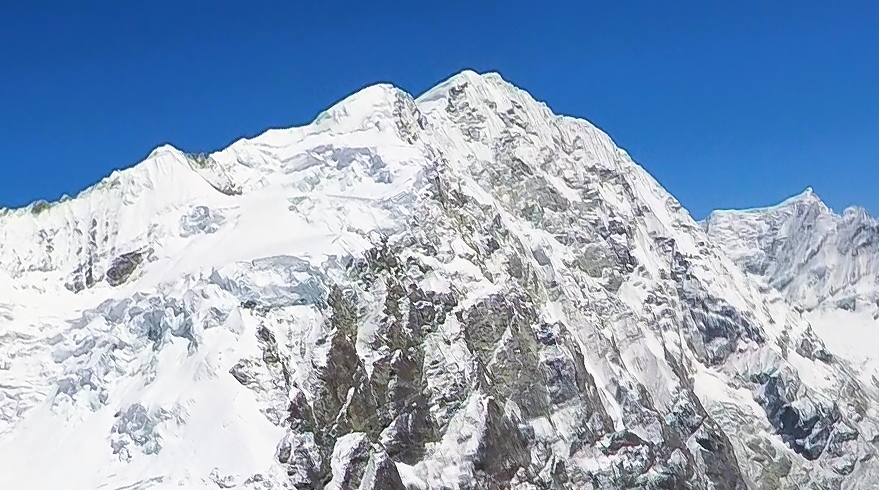
- South aspect

Highest point
- Elevation: 6,918 m (22,697 ft)
- Prominence: 1,266 m (4,154 ft)
- Parent peak: Shishapangma
- Isolation: 11.26 km (7.00 mi)
- Coordinates: 28°16′15″N 85°37′50″E

Geography
- Location within Nepal Location within Tibet Location within China
- Interactive map of Shalbachum
- Location: China–Nepal border
- Countries: Nepal and China
- Province: Bagmati
- District: Rasuwa
- Protected area: Langtang National Park; Qomolangma National Nature Preserve
- Parent range: Himalayas; Langtang Himal

Shalbachum is a mountain in Nepal and Tibet.

== Description ==
Shalbachum, also known as Phrul Rangien Ri, is a 6,918-metre (22,697-foot) glaciated summit in the Himalayas on the China–Nepal border. It is situated 66 kilometres (41 mi) north-northeast of Kathmandu on the boundary shared by Langtang National Park and Qomolangma National Nature Preserve. Precipitation runoff from the mountain's slopes drains into tributaries of the Trishuli River. Topographic relief is significant as the summit rises 2,000 metres (6,560 ft) above the Shalbachum Glacier in 1.5 kilometres (0.93 mi), and 2,700 metres (8,858 ft) above the Langtang Valley in seven kilometres (4.3 mi). The nearest higher peak is Langtang Lirung, 11.26 kilometres (7.00 mi) to the west.

== Climate ==
Based on the Köppen climate classification, Shalbachum is located in a tundra climate zone with cold, snowy winters, and cool summers. Weather systems coming off the Bay of Bengal are forced upwards by the Himalaya mountains (orographic lift), causing heavy precipitation in the form of rainfall and snowfall. Mid-June through early-August is the monsoon season. The months of April, May, September, and October offer the most favorable weather for viewing or climbing this peak.

== See also ==
- Geology of the Himalayas
