= SEED-SCALE =

SEED-SCALE (abbreviation for: Self Evaluation for Effective Decision-making – Systems for Communities to Adapt Learning and Expand) describes a comprehensive theory of social change sometimes also categorized as social development theory. SEED-SCALE can be used both to tell how to implement change and/or it can be used to analyze social change. SEED-SCALE focuses on human energy as the primary currency that causes people to change their behaviors.

Normative thinking is that by allocating money to social programs (funding a health service, starting a micro-finance program, providing subsidies for agriculture, etc.) leads to intentional social action. SEED-SCALE does not deny the impact of budget driven projects. However, it suggests that a more sustainable approach is redirecting how people apply their energies. "Money is powerful because other people want it…” This means, that if it is taken to be the central factor in social change initiatives, those who do not have it (including countries and people who need it most) are powerless."

SEED-SCALE notes that human energy is a resource that is already present, already being used in every community in the world. If the community exists, it has energy. The opportunity is to use that resource more effectively & timely. There are many types of relevant human energies: individual labor, cooperation, creativity, monitoring, learning, and more. SEED-SCALE is an application of emergence within complexity theory, articulating how social change "emerges" with socio-economic development specific to each context of society, economics, and natural environment shaped by the interaction of these relationships; noting that the socio-economic product is not the result of inputs to the system (classical development thinking) but of how relationships form within the system, as a result of principle interaction (emergence).

SEED-SCALE takes inspiration from several established figures within the financial field, such as former World Bank economist, according to Paul Collier, "change in societies at the very bottom must come primarily from within." Professor Dani Rodrik at Harvard, frames economic growth at the scale level as a consequence of growth aggregated from the local level, growing within the existing larger framework. Local growth occurs not because of inputs from outside but because it has figured out how to occur within the local situation of policies, stimuli, and resources.

== History and origins ==
The origins of SEED-SCALE began in UNICEF in 1992—when the then Executive Director James P. Grant was seeking a more accurate understanding of how to take successful pilot projects ("seeds") and to extend these to national level impact ("scale"). From the initial 1992 UNICEF charge two publications resulted. These publications were presented at the World Summit for Social Development, Copenhagen, March 1995.

SEED-SCALE resides within the larger field of emergence and complexity theory. The thesis is that social change occurs within the complex intersection of people's values, economic dynamics, and environmental conditions (the socio-econo-info-biosphere), and that to either understand or to act in that complex world, answers do not directly follow from actions; they "emerge" out of interacting relationships in almost incomprehensible ways, obvious perhaps after the fact but impossible to predict ahead of time.

Recent articulation of empowerment as basis of social change championed by Robert Chambers, who led in the development of participatory research and action (also called participatory rural appraisal) (PRA) "astonished by the analytical abilities of poor people. Whether literate or not, whether children, women, or men, they showed that they could map, list, rank, score, and diagram better than professionals." Key contributions to the thinking also came from asset-based community development (ABCD) and the theory of positive deviance.

SEED is an acronym for Self Evaluation for Effective Decision-making. SCALE is an acronym for Systems for Communities to Adapt Learning and Expand.

== Core argument ==
Deep fundamental change happens because of what people do (not what they are given, not what is done to them). When people learn to make use of what they have, where they are, today—then people are moving forward to a future that they can shape according to their priorities.

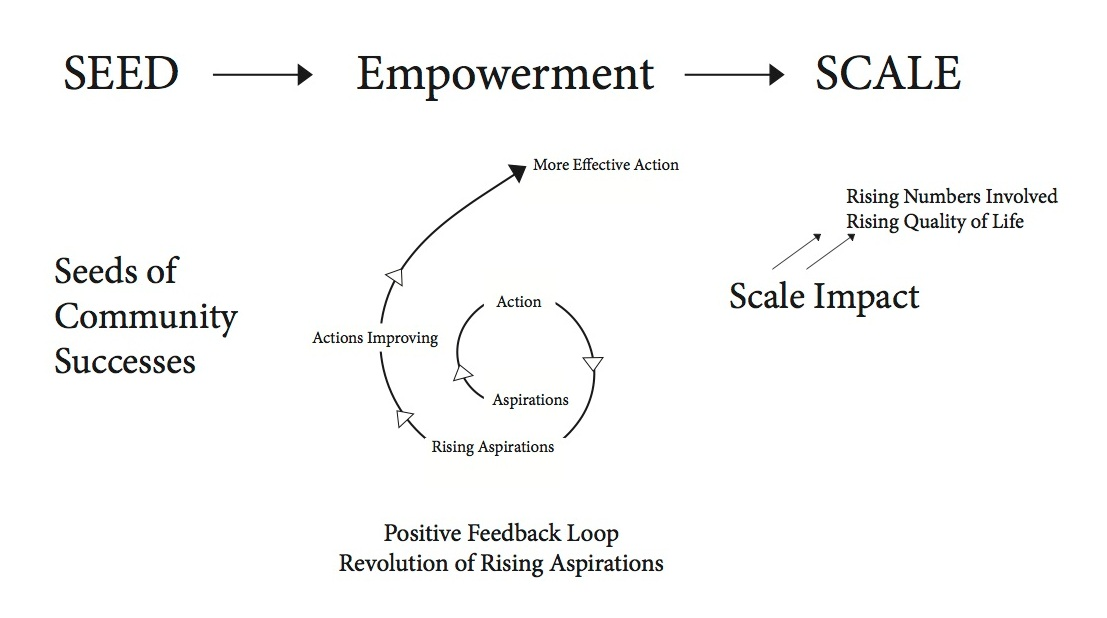
The Revolution of Rising Aspirations

A feedback loop, a revolution of rising aspirations, gets started—where people's hopes cause them to work, then that work produces returns, those returns prompt further work, and this circle calls more people in working with their aspirations. As actions get fulfilled and cause new aspirations, what unfolds is society using what it has, for what it wants, and now calling in resources and action from outside.

=== Key principles ===
1. Build from Success—Don't try to fix failures (note: given that failures are complex eco-systems of individual and community expenditures or experiments with social development, failures should not be completely ignored but understood as historical reservoirs that may inform the successful strategies that the SEED-SCALE practitioner(s) are linking together to generate local change in the present)
2. 3-way Partnership (Top-down, Bottom-up, and Outside-in)—Three types of partnerships are needed for sustainable development. One is Top-down, involving collaboration among community, government officials, and international financial providers. The other is Bottom-up, involving collaboration within a community to frame and act on priorities. The third is Outside-in, which includes involvement of academia and other development partners, such as the Civil Society organizations and NGOs.
3. Decide from Evidence—Power Money Dogma not reliable answers
4. Behavior Change is the Goal—Prescribed outputs can be faked

Discussions of the four principles are at:

1. Buckminster Fuller Institute
2. Future Generations University

=== Action tasks ===
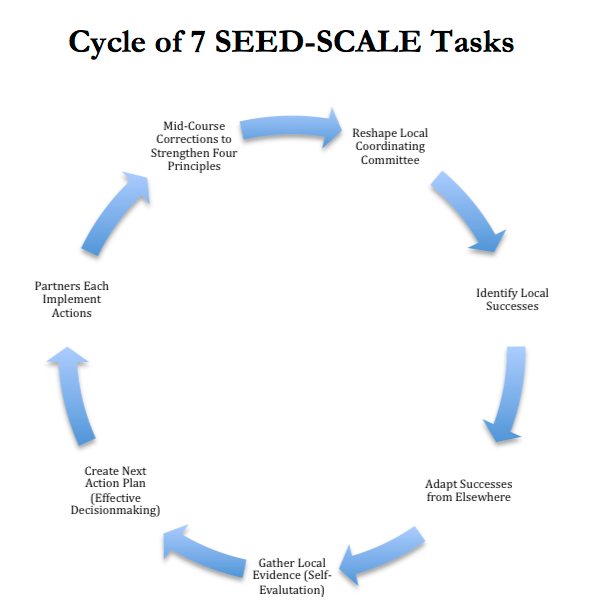

1. Develop Leadership = Create Local Coordinating Committee
2. Starting Point & Resources = Identify Your Community Successes
3. Obtain Relevant Education = Visit Successes Elsewhere, Adapt and Adopt
4. Fit your local situation (ecology, economy, & culture) = Self-evaluation survey
5. Determine direction & partners = Make a work plan
6. Coordinate resources & time = Gather community participation
7. Readjust community momentum = To strengthen four principles

=== Criteria for evaluation ===
- EQUITY=Are more community members involved this time?
- SUSTAINABILITY=Three types exist: environmental, economic, values/culture
- HOLISM=Is life improving in a balanced way
- INTERDEPENDENCE=What is balance in community between inflows and outflows
- ITERATION=Get job done, next time do it better

=== Stages of scale ===
The scaling up process is a feedback loop of rising quality of life that then draws a rising number of participants into it. As more people become involved, their energy stimulates demand for further rising quality of life (typically moving cross sectors such as from health to income generation). Then the rising quality of life draws in more people. The cycle goes on of numerical growth feeding qualitative so long as there is an enabling environment for such of policies and learning that draws on local resource base or distant resources that can be accessed from locales.

1. Numerical Expansion = SCALE One (Stimulating Community Awareness, Learning, and Energy)
2. Rising sophistication and quality of life = SCALE Squared (Self-help Centers for Action Learning and Experimentation)
3. Expanding the Enabling Environment = SCALE Cubed (Synthesis of Collaboration, Adaptive Learning, and Extension)

Future Generations Graduate School (FGGS) 2015 class, on a residential in India learned on the practical applicability of the SEED Scale in Sevagram (Feb. 09-March 12, 2014). It is an empowering concept that can grow to scale any initiative in the local community whose benefits are long lasting. This is an alternative development paradigm. The different economic development models which have been existing have all but shown their limits. SEED scale appears to be a good alternative for African countries.

== Publications ==
- Daniel C. Taylor, Carl E. Taylor, Jesse O. Taylor, Empowerment on an Unstable Planet: From Seeds of Human Energy to a Scale of Global Change (New York: Oxford University Press, 2012)
- Daniel Taylor and Carl E. Taylor, Just and Lasting Change: When communities own their futures (Baltimore: Johns Hopkins University Press, 2002)
- Carl E. Taylor. Aditi Desai, and Daniel Taylor Partnership for Social Development—A Casebook The Independent Task Force on Community Action for Social Development (Franklin, WV, Future Generations, and Johns Hopkins University Department of International Health, 1995)
- Daniel Taylor and Carl E. Taylor Community Based Sustainable Human Development—Going to Scale with Self-reliant Social Development (New York: UNICEF, 1995)
