= Climate change in Nepal =

Emissions, impacts and responses of Nepal related to climate change

Köppen climate classification map for Nepal for 1980–2016

2071–2100 map under the most intense climate change scenario. Mid-range scenarios are currently considered more likely

Globally, Nepal is ranked fourth in terms of vulnerability to climate change. Floods spread across the foothills of the Himalayas and bring landslides, leaving tens of thousands of houses and vast areas of farmland and roads destroyed. In the 2020 edition of Germanwatch's Climate Risk Index, it was judged to be the ninth hardest-hit nation by climate calamities during the period 1999 to 2018. Nepal is a least developed country, with 28.6 percent of the population living in multidimensional poverty. Analysis of trends from 1971 to 2014 by the Department of Hydrology and Meteorology (DHM) shows that the average annual maximum temperature has been increasing by 0.056°C per year. Precipitation extremes are found to be increasing. A national-level survey on the perception-based survey on climate change reported that locals accurately perceived the shifts in temperature but their perceptions of precipitation change did not converge with the instrumental records. Data reveals that more than 80 percent of property loss due to disasters is attributable to climate hazards, particularly water-related events such as floods, landslides and Glacial Lake Outburst Floods (GLOFs).

The floods of 2018 spread across the foothills of the Himalayas and brought landslides. They have left tens of thousands of houses and vast areas of farmland and roads destroyed. Nepal experienced flash floods and landslides in August, 2018 across the southern border, amounting to US$600 million in damages. There are reports of land which was once used for growing vegetables, and has become barren. Yak herders struggle to find grazing patches for their animals. Scientists have found that rising temperatures could spread malaria and dengue to new areas of the Himalayas, where mosquitoes have started to appear in the highlands.

== Impacts on the natural environment ==
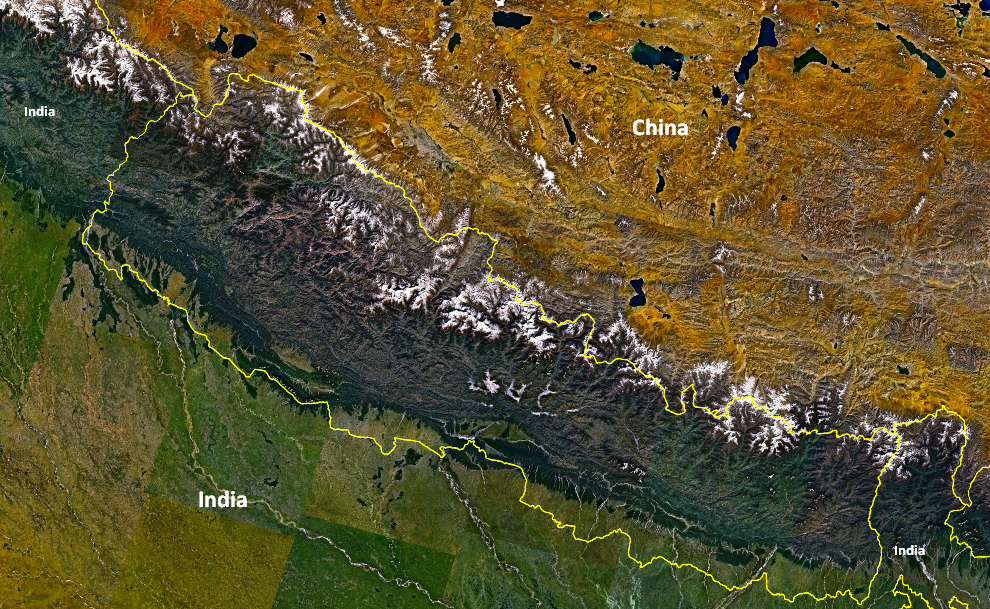
NASA Landsat 7 Nepal

=== Temperature and weather changes ===
A climate trend analysis of Nepal (1971-2014) shows that the annual maximum temperature trend is significantly positive (0.056oC/yr). All Nepal annual minimum temperature trend is also positive (0.002oC/yr) but it is insignificant. In the Everest region of eastern Nepal, the annual maximum temperature has been rising by about 0.06°C per year, and the 30 days before the August 2024 Thame GLOF were the warmest recorded in the area between 1990 and 2024. This warming has contributed to glacier retreat. Nepal's glaciers shrank by approximately 14% between 1970 and 2010, while the area of its glacial lakes expanded by about 25% between 1987 and 2017.

The effects of greenhouse gases (GHGs) on both drought and flooding events have been found, including severe winter drought and excessive monsoon flooding. Climate change has been alarming in the context of global warming. In Nepal, 95% of greenhouse gas emissions are from agriculture and forestry sectors; of this, 77% was from the forestry sector only. The consequences of global warming have had the most impact in developing and mountainous countries like Nepal, which has high intensity rainfall during rainy season. It has resulted in heavy floods, landslides and soil erosion. It is also common to find drought in many parts of Nepal that comes from the impacts of climate change and it impacts sectors like forest, water resources, agriculture, human health and biodiversity.

=== Dengue fever expansion ===
Historically confined to the lowland Terai region and urban transit hubs, dengue fever has expanded rapidly across Nepal due to shifting climate patterns. Since the first documented case in 2004 and initial outbreaks in 2006, national surveillance has tracked a steep rise in case numbers, geographic spread, and elevation boundaries. A massive epidemic during 2022–2023 reached all 77 districts of the country, recording a peak of 54,784 cases and 88 deaths in 2022 alone, with the geographic burden shifting from Kathmandu in 2022 eastward to Koshi Province in 2023.

Rising temperatures and changing precipitation patterns have created widening thermal suitability and longer seasonal transmission windows in the mid-hills, including around major population and tourist centers like Kathmandu and Pokhara. The primary mosquito vectors, Aedes aegypti and Aedes albopictus, have been detected at altitudes up to 2,100 meters in central Nepal. While definitive laboratory confirmation of active local viral transmission in the high Himalayas remains limited, clinical cases and active vectors are increasingly reported beyond the monsoon season in high-altitude districts such as Humla and Solukhumbu, signaling that altitude is becoming a less reliable proxy for arboviral safety in the region.

== Impacts on people ==
=== Economic impacts ===
==== Agriculture ====
Altogether 14 glacial lake outburst floods (GLOFs) occurred between 1935 and 1991. In total, 21 GLOFs have been identified as being potentially dangerous at present. A recent example occurred in August 2024, when a cascading GLOF, where one lake's outburst triggered the failure of a second lake below it, struck Thame village in the Everest region. The flood displaced 135 people and destroyed several buidlings, including the local primary school, as well as farmland and about 500 m of trekking trail, causing an estimated US$6.18 million in losses. No deaths were recorded as residents evacuated soon after receiving warnings.In this way, CC and livelihoods integral part and have vice versa relationship. The low income and subsistence users are about 38% of total population. It is a great challenge to cope with climate change induced hazards and extreme events. The livelihoods of more than 80% of the local people of hilly region are heavily dependent on climate sensitive areas such as agriculture, forest and livestock and on other natural resources such as water and irrigation.

== Adaptation ==
=== Nepal's National Adaptation Plan process ===
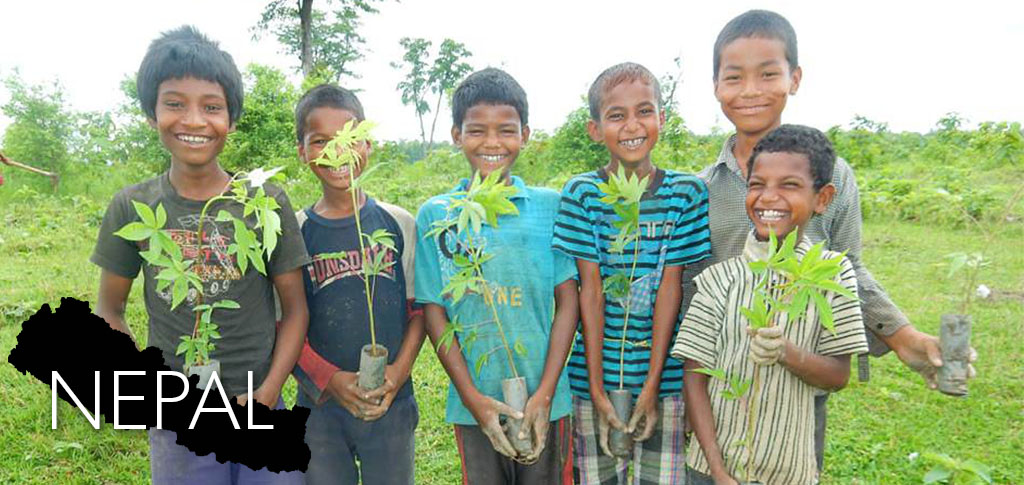
Nepal reforestation

In 2010, the Government of Nepal approved the National Adaptation Programme of Action (NAPA). NAPA was developed as a requirement under the UNFCCC to access funding for the most urgent and immediate adaptation needs from the Least Developed Countries Fund (LDCF).

In Nepal, NAPA was developed with three components: preparation and dissemination of NAPA documents, development and maintenance of the Nepal Climate Change Knowledge Management Centre (NCCKMC), and development of the Multi-Stakeholder Climate Change Initiative Coordination Committee (MCCICC).

In NAPA, nine integrated projects have been identified as the urgent and immediate national adaptation priority. They are:

1. Promoting community-based adaptation through integrated management of agriculture, water, forest and biodiversity sector
2. Building and enhancing adaptive capacity of vulnerable communities through improved system and access to services related to agriculture development
3. Community-based disaster management for facilitating climate adaptation
4. GLOF monitoring and disaster risk reduction, and forest and ecosystem management for supporting climate-led adaptation innovations
5. Adapting to climate challenges in public health and ecosystem management for climate adaptation
6. Empowering vulnerable communities through sustainable management of water resource and clean energy support, and promoting climate smart urban settlement

NAPA's implementation framework envisages that the operating costs will be kept to a minimum and at least 80% of the available financial resources will reach the local level to fund activities on the ground. Stakeholders in Nepal has also started discussing National Adaptation Plans(NAPs), which are medium and long term adaptation plans for the country as decided by UNFCCC.

Nepal's NAP process builds on past experience with adaptation planning, including through the National Adaptation Programme of Action (NAPA), developed in 2010, and the Framework on Local Adaptation Plans for Action (LAPA), developed in 2011, which has facilitated development of adaptation plans by Village Development Committees across the country. Nepal launched its National Adaptation Plan (NAP) process in September 2015. The two main objectives of the NAP are (i) to reduce vulnerability to climate change impacts by improving resilience and adaptive capacity, and (ii) to integrate climate change adaptation into new and current policies, programs, activities, and development strategies across all sectors and levels of government.

At present, the United Nations Environment Programme (UNEP) is executing the NAP process through the project, "Building Capacity to Advance National Adaptation Plan Process in Nepal," with financial support from the Green Climate Fund (GCF). Building on the NAPA formulation and implementation experiences, this project supports the Climate Change Management Division (CCMD) of the Ministry of Forests and Environment, in the NAP formulation process, through a participatory, country-driven, gender-sensitive and multi-sectoral working group approach, emphasizing "leave no one behind" as the guiding principle. To mainstream the interlinked climate change issues into the overall development process, the National Climate Change Policy that came into effect in 2019 identified eight thematic and four cross-cutting areas. Based on that, the NAP formulation process engages eight thematic working groups (TWGs) and four cross-cutting working groups (CWGs) to cover the climate-sensitive approach. In line with the National Climate Change Policy 2019, the project works through the seven Provincial Climate Change Coordination Committees (PC4), one in each province. The PC4 is a medium between the federal and provincial governments concerning climate change.

=== Potentiality of climate change adaptation ===
Response to climate change in Nepal has been growing in recent years with an effort to cope with the changing situation and build resilience capacity into adaptation to climate change. In climate induced vulnerability context, Nepal has developed policy level provision such as the National Adaptation Programme of Action to climate change (NAPA). The NAPA document opened the door to act adaptation activities into country. Under the provision of national level policy, the Local Adaptation Plan of Action (LAPA) national framework was devised out by government. It only mentioned the provision of the implementation mechanism at district or village development committee level to act on climate change adaptation. However, this document is still silent on provision of implementation mechanism at community level. Although the framework does not mention adaptation implementation mechanisms at community level, some community level adaptive strategies are being implemented. These strategies are community based adaptation plans for poor and vulnerable communities with less capacity to cope with disasters and are more dependent on natural resources for their livelihoods. Researchers studying GLOFs in the Everest region have argued that national hazard assessments focus mainly on large glacial lakes and often overlook smaller ones, and have recommended monitoring regardless of size. They also found that early warning systems and reducing exposure of downstream communities are more effective adaptation measures than costly engineering projects such as lake lowering.

=== Adaptation in the agricultural sector ===
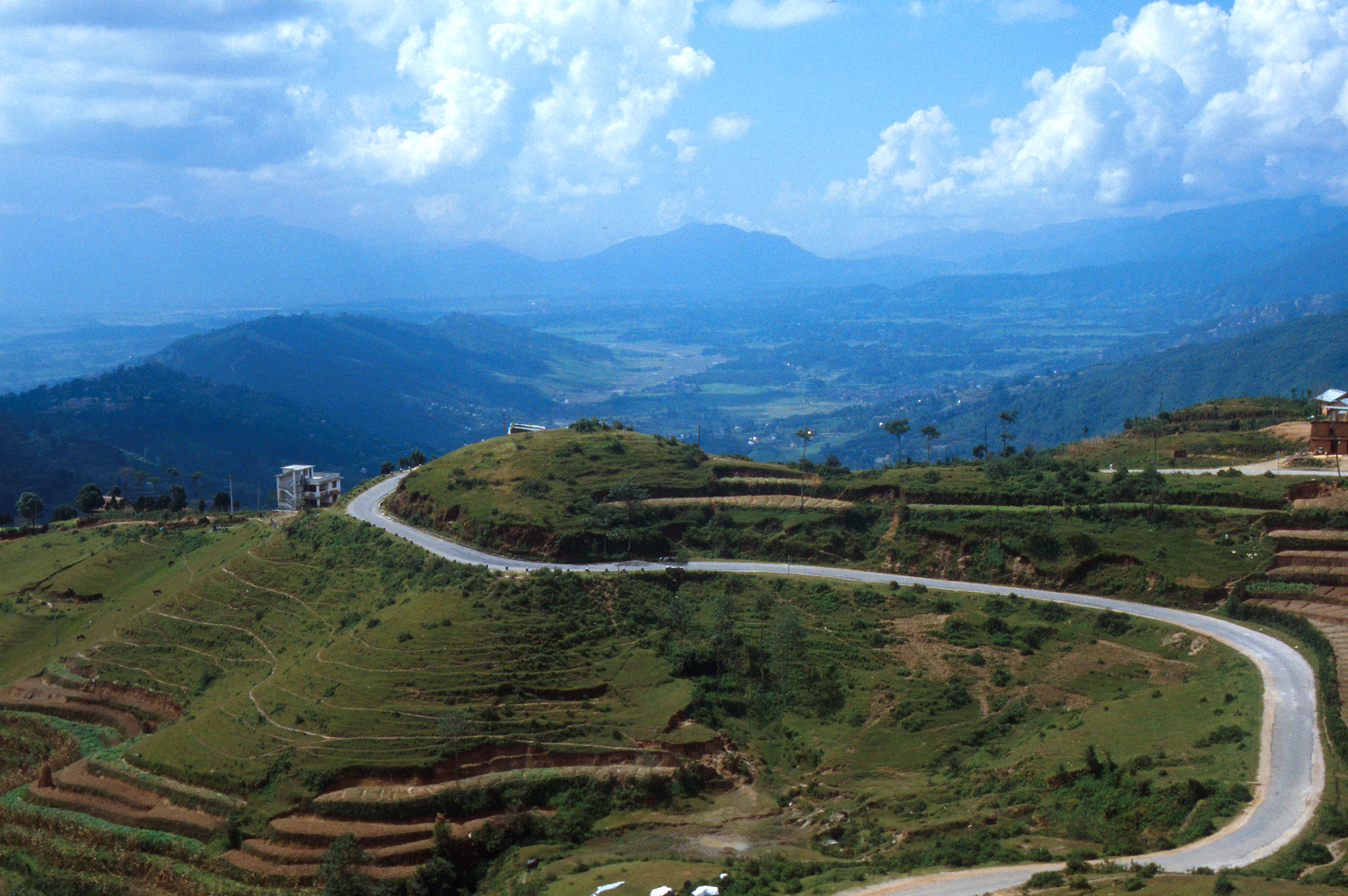
Nepal landscape

Adaptation to climate change in the agricultural sector and allied sectors is a major current and future challenge for Nepal. The majority of the population is still dependent on highly climate-sensitive sector like agriculture. In recent years, long drought spells during the monsoon season and increased temperatures and unseasonal heavy rains during winter have caused serious distress to agriculture-dependent communities in many locations. If the Sustainable Development Goals (SDGs) of ending poverty, achieving food security and promoting sustainable agriculture are to be realized, climate change adaptation interventions need to be implemented in earnest.

=== Goods and services from community forest ===
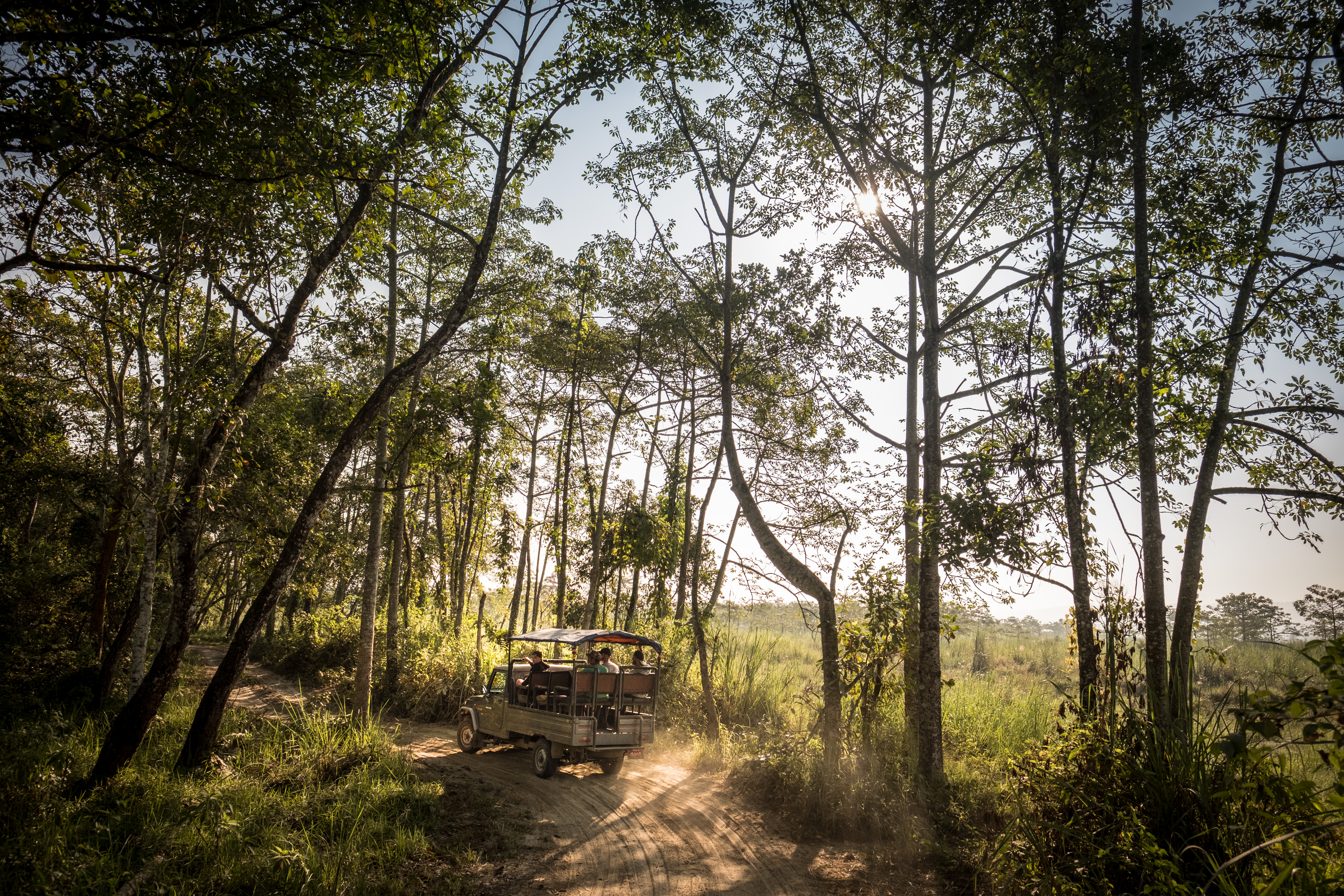
USAID Measuring Impact Conservation Enterprise Retrospective (Nepal; National Trust for Nature Conservation)

After 3 decades of CF in Nepal, more than 1.652 million forest lands were handed over to 1.45 million households of 17,685 community forest user group (CFUG) for conservation, management and utilization. CFUG as a common property resource management program in Nepal have resulted in improving forest cover and condition. Institutionally, CFUG are autonomous, independent and accountable institution for conserving, managing and utilizing of natural resources in Nepal legitimized by Forest Act 1992 and Forest Regulation 1995 of Nepal. The additional advantages are, effective protection, wise use of resources, plantation, forest fire control, and more effective contribution to local development and economic generation. It enhanced biodiversity, water flow and soil stability. More than 90% of villagers report that their forests are in better condition than a decade ago. Furthermore, CFs are able to meet poor and vulnerable households' daily subsistence needs for forest products such as firewood, fodder and timber. Apart from this, growing forests capture and store carbon that are contributing to both mitigation and adaptation to climate change. Because of, user groups have institutionally developed after CF handed over. Furthermore, the landscape of hills of Nepal drastically transformed into greenery. Such types of changes have positive impact on carbon sequestration which has contributed in reducing effects of climate change.

It is not only the CF contributing in climate change adaptation by providing goods and services, the CFUGs have also been used as local institutions for adaptation planning.

=== Constraints to adaptation ===
A report on Climate Change Impacts and Adaptation in Nepal has identified the major constraints to adaptation in Nepal are:

- Dependence on Subsistence Agriculture
- Challenging Geophysical Conditions
- Population Growth in Urban Centers
- Institutional Failures and Weaknesses
- Constantly Changing Organizational Structures
- High Turnover of Government Personnel
- Failures of Public Institutions
- Ineffective to Nonexistent Coordination
- Deficient Capacity

Traditional top-down decision-making processes have become inadequate, due to their inability to create appropriate solutions for local communities. Nepal's forest cover, condition and quality are being improved. This is the success of only through three way partnership such as communities from bottom-up function, government and donors from top-down function and NGOs, civil society network from outside-in. In this situation, CFUGs have to be involved in mainstreaming to implement climate change adaptation. It is due to they are playing the key role in proactive in investing their funds, climate change knowledge transfer and policy feedback to adopt to the impact of climate change. Policy shall be emphasized the establishing groups around the resources that are indispensable for the livelihoods of poor and vulnerable groups to access diversification opportunity. It is necessary to bridge this gap; bottom-up approaches may produce the best results by building on local experiences and knowledge. For this, building-up the capacity of groups and their poor and vulnerable communities on climate change mitigation and adaptation is pertinent. In addition to this, focus needs to be given on institutional development, capacity building and awarding CFUGs for their good work on forest development and bio-diversity protection which ultimately contributes to ecological and environment balance.

== Society and culture ==
=== Gender ===
In Nepal, women are also responsible for the traditional daily household chores including food production, household water supply and energy for heating. However, these tasks are likely to become more time-consuming and difficult, as the impacts of climate change increase, if women have to travel farther to collect items. This proves to be an additional stressor for women, increasing their risk to health hazards and illnesses, and in turn increasing their vulnerability to climate change.
