= Pendeba Program =

Pendeba is a community-based volunteer worker. This name was first proposed by PuQiong who is the vice director of the Qomolangma National Nature Preserve. It is made up of three Tibetan words: "Pen" means benefiting the whole community; "Deh" means harmonious, healthy, holistic; "Ba" means worker.

== Mission ==
Pendeba educates and empowers the local communities living in the conservation area to protect the natural resources, through the training, workshop and observation tours.

== Working strategy ==
1. All programs implement as partnership between government line agencies, local community and INGOs, NGOs

2. Encourage to mobilize the local resources

3. Awareness raising and capacity building through the training and workshops

4. Develop local human resource in order to achieve sustainability of the development programs

5. Establish model and experimentation centers

6. Expansion and scaling up the program in other villages and counties

7. Integrated development
