= The Mountain Institute =

Nonprofit organization based in the U.S.

- Founded: Cherry Grove, WV, 1972
- Founders: Daniel C. Taylor, King Seegar, & Lila Bishop
- Headquarters: Washington, D.C.
- Region served: The Andean, Appalachian, Himalayan, and other Mountain Ranges
- Website: www.mountain.org

The Mountain Institute (TMI) is an international non-profit organization headquartered in Washington, D.C., and operates regional field offices in the Andes, Appalachians, and Himalayas. Respectively, these are the longest, the oldest, and the tallest mountain ranges in the world. TMI is the sole organization dedicated to conservation and development in mountain regions.

== History ==
The Mountain Institute was founded in 1972 as the Woodlands & Whitewater Institute in Cherry Grove, West Virginia, by Daniel C. Taylor and King Seegar. In 1973, TMI's work expanded to experiential and leadership education for youth. The Baltimore Friends School, of which TMI's founders are alumni, was the first school course. St. Paul's School for Girls came next, and the founders were soon working with a number of schools in the Baltimore, Washington, D.C., Pittsburgh, and New York City areas. TMI became an international organization in 1987, when it assisted in the establishment of Makalu Barun National Park in Nepal and the adjacent Qomolangma National Nature Preserve in the Tibet Autonomous Region of China. At this time, the organization changed its name to "Woodlands Mountain Institute" to reflect its broad work in the world's mountain ranges. "Woodlands" was later dropped, leaving it with its current name.

The Andes program began in 1996, and The Mountain Institute has been involved in a variety of conservation and community programs in the Himalayas since 1987.

== Awards and recognition ==
- 2018: $100,000 from The "St Andrews Prize for the Environment"
