= Makalu Barun National Park =

National park of Nepal

- Nepali: मकालु बरुण राष्ट्रिय निकुञ्ज
- IUCN category II (national park)
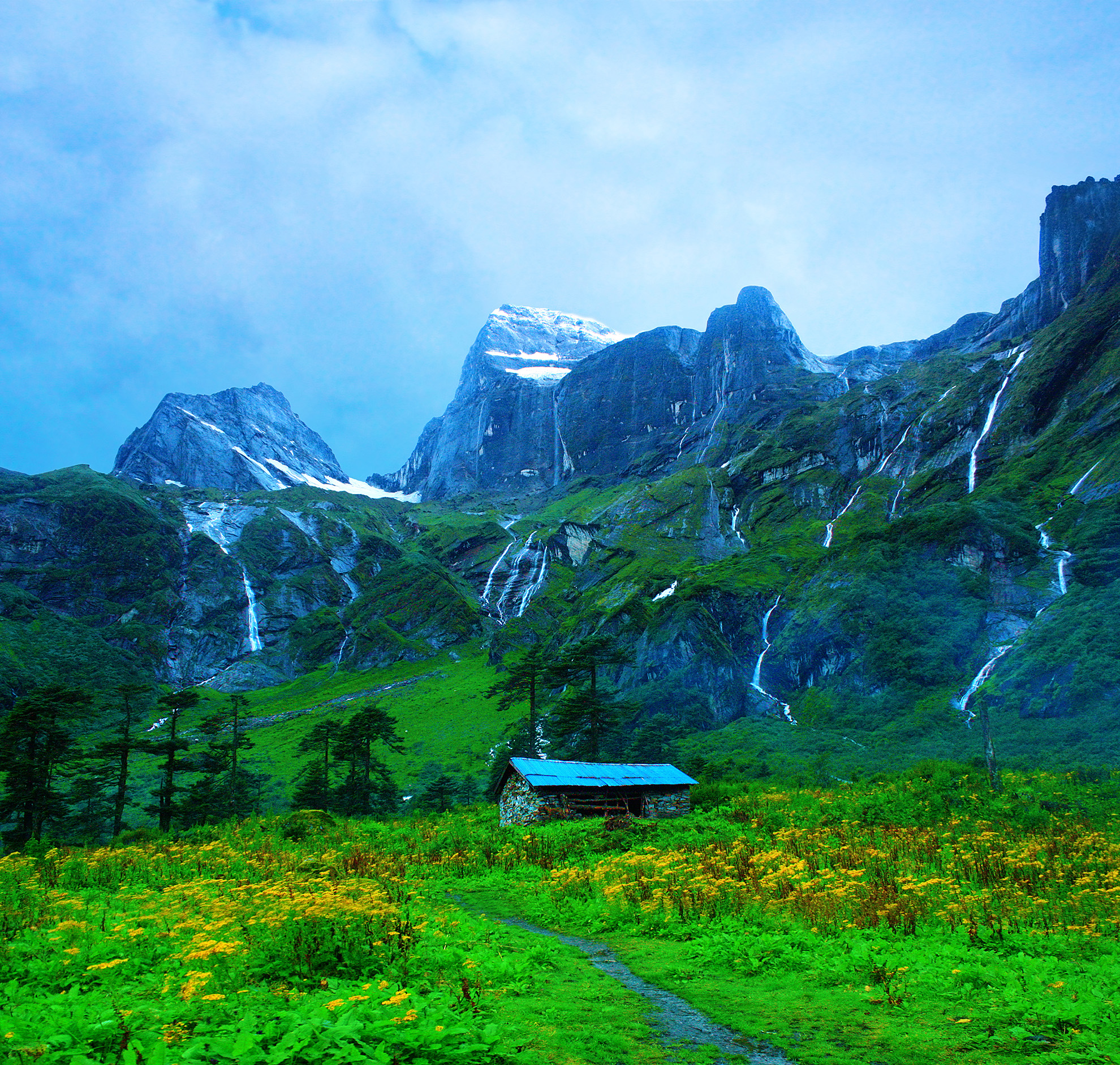
- Landscape in Makalu Barun National Park

- Location within Koshi Province Location within Nepal Location within South Asia
- Location: Koshi Province, Nepal
- Coordinates: 27°45′25″N 87°06′49″E
- Area: 1,500 km^{2} (580 sq mi)
- Established: 1992
- Governing body: Department of National Parks and Wildlife Conservation

Makalu Barun National Park is a national park in the Himalayas of Nepal that was established in 1992 as the eastern extension of Sagarmatha National Park. It is the world's only protected area with an elevation gain of more than 8,000 m (26,000 ft) enclosing tropical forest as well as snow-capped peaks. It covers an area of 1,500 km^{2} (580 sq mi) in the Solukhumbu and Sankhuwasabha districts, and is surrounded by a bufferzone to the south and southeast with an area of 830 km^{2} (320 sq mi).

The rugged summits of Makalu, with 8,463 m (27,766 ft) the fifth highest mountain in the world, Chamalang (7,319 m (24,012 ft)), Baruntse (7,129 m (23,389 ft)) and Mera (6,654 m (21,831 ft)) are included in the national park. The protected area extends to about 66 km (41 mi) from west to east and to about 44 km (27 mi) from north to south. From the Arun river valley in the southeast, located at altitudes of 344–377 m (1,129–1,237 ft), elevation gains about 8,025 m (26,329 ft) to the peak of Makalu. The national park shares the international border with the Qomolangma National Nature Preserve of the Tibet Autonomous Region in the north.

The protected area is part of the Sacred Himalayan Landscape.

== History ==
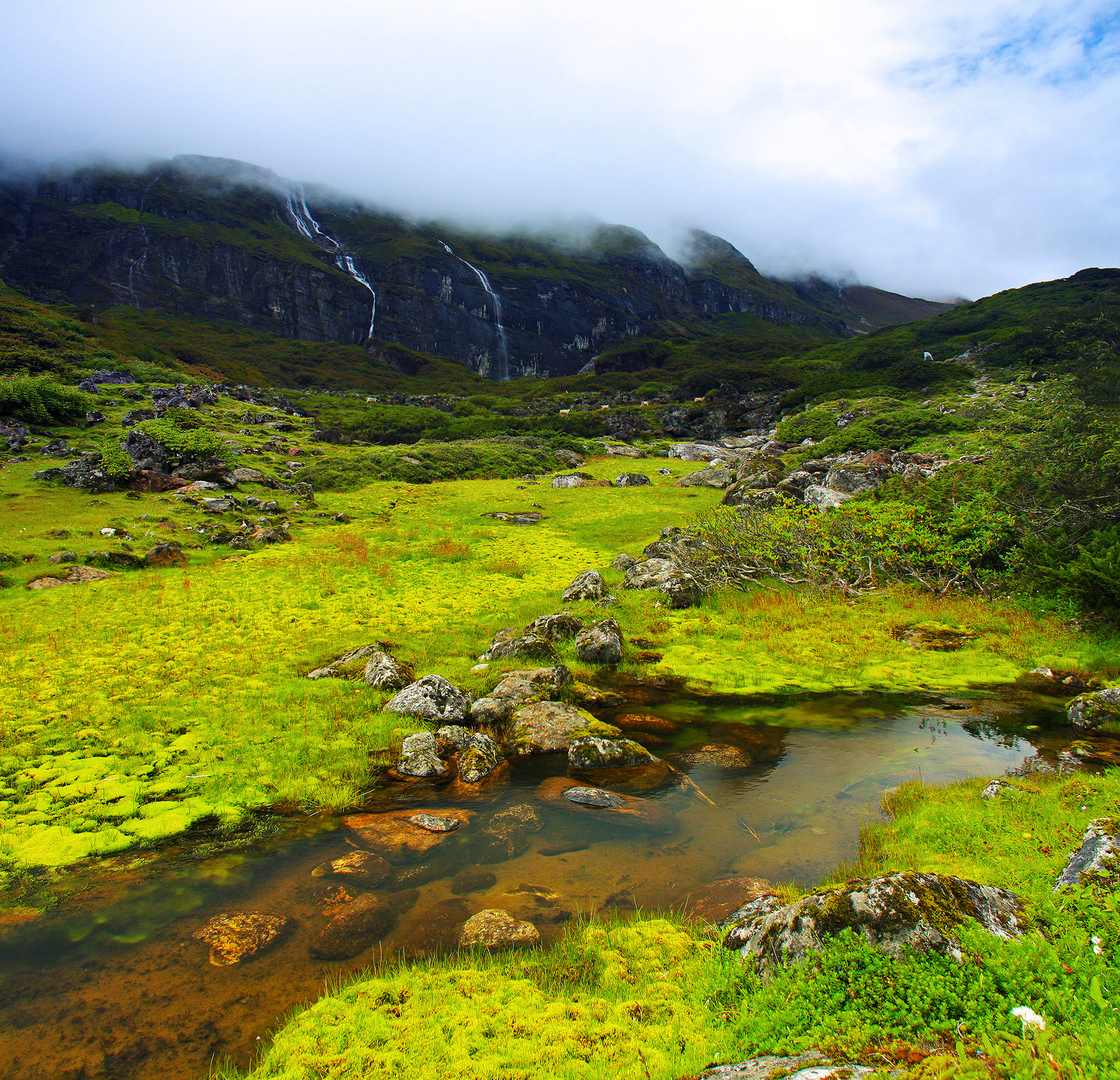
Barun Valley

In the early and mid-1980s, personnel of The Mountain Institute (TMI), under its president Daniel C. Taylor conducted surveys in the Barun Valley to study whether an explanation could be found for the enigma of the Yeti. Those surveys then uncovered this valley's extraordinary biological richness. The results of these surveys led to interest in creating a new protected area. A respective proposal was formulated in 1985. In 1988, the Makalu-Barun Conservation Area Project (MBNPCA) was initiated as a joint endeavor of the Department of National Parks and Wildlife Conservation and TMI.

The MBNPCA was officially gazetted in 1991. At the time, about 32,000 people resided in the conservation area's 12 Village Development Committees, who are primarily subsistence farmers of the Limbu, Sherpa, Yakkha, Gurung, Tamang, Magar, Newar, Brahmin and Chhetri ethnic groups. An innovative community-based conservation approach emphasized the management of biodiversity with local communities. Community Forest User Groups were created with legal rights to use designated forested areas on a sustainable basis. Ecotourism was promoted as a way of expanding off-farm employment opportunities for local people while at the same time minimizing negative environmental impact. Hunting and trapping of rare and endangered wild animals is strictly prohibited in the MBNPCA, except in extreme cases of threat to human life. There was also a provision for compensating farmers for crop and livestock depredation caused by endangered species.

In 1999, the conservation area was converted into a buffer zone. Under the Buffer Zone Management Guidelines the conservation of forests, wildlife and cultural resources received top priority, followed by the conservation of other natural resources and the development of alternative energy.

The inaccessible valleys of the Barun River, the glacier-fed tributary to the Arun River, treasure some of the last remaining pristine forests and alpine meadows. This area has been designated as a Strict Nature Reserve, the first in Nepal, in order to protect natural ecosystems and processes in an undisturbed state for scientific study, environmental monitoring, education and the maintenance of genetic resources.

== Climate ==
The park is located in the eastern climatic zone of the Himalayas, where monsoon starts in June and eases off in late September. During these months about 70% of the annual precipitation of 4,000 mm (160 in) falls. The first monsoon clouds reach the area in April. Temperatures vary greatly due to the extreme difference in altitude in the entire area. Lower elevations are temperate throughout winter and hot during April and May. The tropical and subtropical zones are frost free, with average monthly mean temperatures above 18 °C (64 °F).

== Vegetation ==
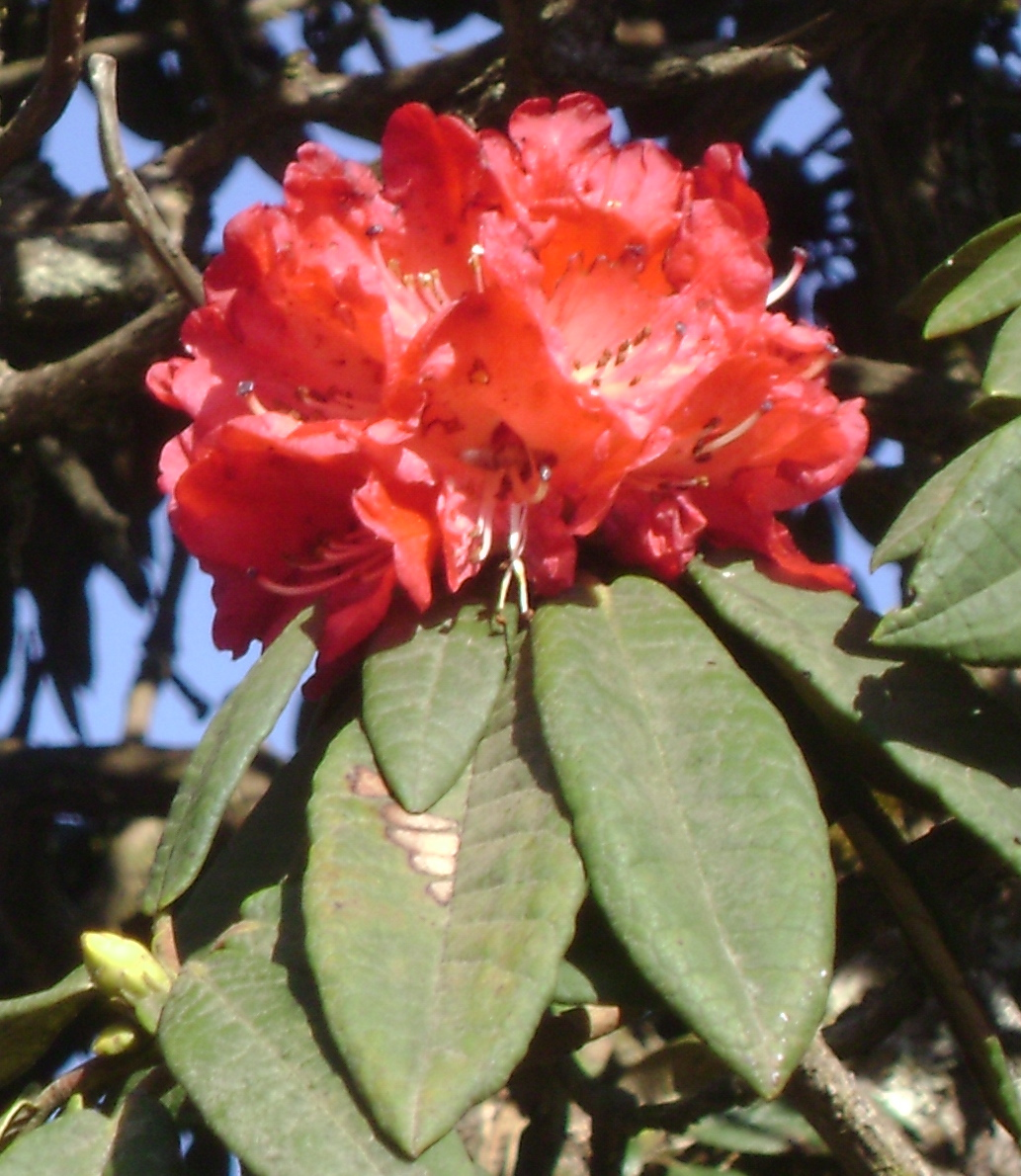
Rhododendron arboreum – the floral emblem of Nepal

The Makalu Barun National Park exhibits a high diversity of forest types that are characteristic for the Eastern Himalayas, ranging from near-tropical dipterocarp monsoon forest on 400 m (1,300 ft) altitude to subalpine conifer stands on 4,000 m (13,000 ft) altitude. Forest aspects vary depending on seasonal moisture availability, temperature and snow cover at different elevations and slopes. Forests below 2,000 m (6,600 ft) are strongly affected by subsistence agriculture, so that only some ecologically significant stands remain there. Above 2,000 m (6,600 ft) forests are usually extensive since the cool, humid climate suppresses agricultural activity. Forests span five bioclimatic zones:

- Tropical – below 1,000 m (3,300 ft) with stands of Sal;
- Subtropical – from 1,000 to 2,000 m (3,300 to 6,600 ft) with stands of Schima and Castanopsis;
- Lower and upper temperate – from 2,000 to 3,000 m (6,600 to 9,800 ft) with predominantly broadleaf evergreen species of oak and laurel families and broadleaf deciduous stands of maple and magnolia;
- Subalpine – from 3,000 to 4,000 m (9,800 to 13,100 ft) with stands of Himalayan birch and East Himalayan fir; along a transect from outer, southern slopes to the inner valleys these stands are dominated by conifers such as juniper and fir.

On alpine pastures at altitudes above 4,000 m (13,000 ft) the religiously important dwarf rhododendron and juniper, aromatic herbs and wildflowers grow. The region above 5,000 m (16,000 ft) comprises mainly rock and ice with little vegetation.

Botanists recorded 3,128 species of flowering plants, including 25 of Nepal's 30 varieties of rhododendron, 48 primroses, 47 orchids, 19 bamboos, 15 oaks, 86 fodder trees and 67 economically valuable aromatic and medicinal plants.

== Fauna ==
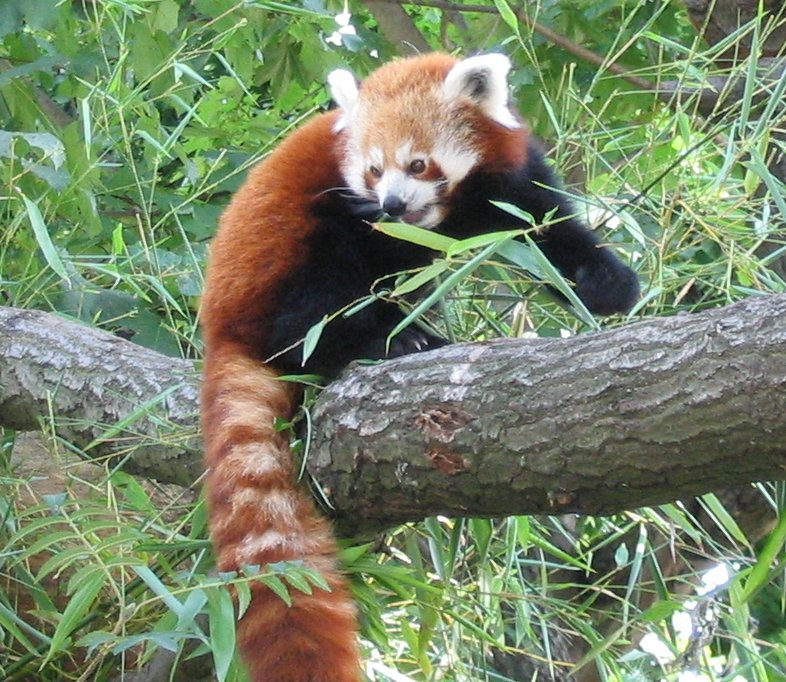
Red panda

The protected area is habitat for a wide diversity of faunal species. There are 315 species of butterflies, 43 species of reptile and 16 species of amphibians. 78 species of fish inhabit the many ponds, lakes and rivers. Ornithologists have recorded 440 bird species, ranging from eagles and other raptors to white-necked storks and brilliantly colored sunbirds. The 16 rare or protected bird species include the rose-ringed parakeet, Blyth's kingfisher, deep-blue kingfisher, blue-naped pitta, pale blue flycatcher, sultan tit, silver-eared mesia, spiny babbler and the white-naped yuhina.

The 88 species of mammals include snow leopard, Indian leopard, clouded leopard, jungle cat, leopard cat, golden jackal, Himalayan wolf, red fox, red panda, black bear, Hanuman langur, Assam macaque, Himalayan tahr, Himalayan goral, muntjac, musk deer, barking deer, Himalayan serow, wild boar, flying squirrel, otters, spotted linsang, weasel and Himalayan marmot. In May 2009, zoologists obtained the first camera trap image of an Asian golden cat at an altitude of 2,517 m (8,258 ft).
