= Qomolangma National Nature Preserve =

Protected natural area in Tibet, China

- IUCN category II (national park)
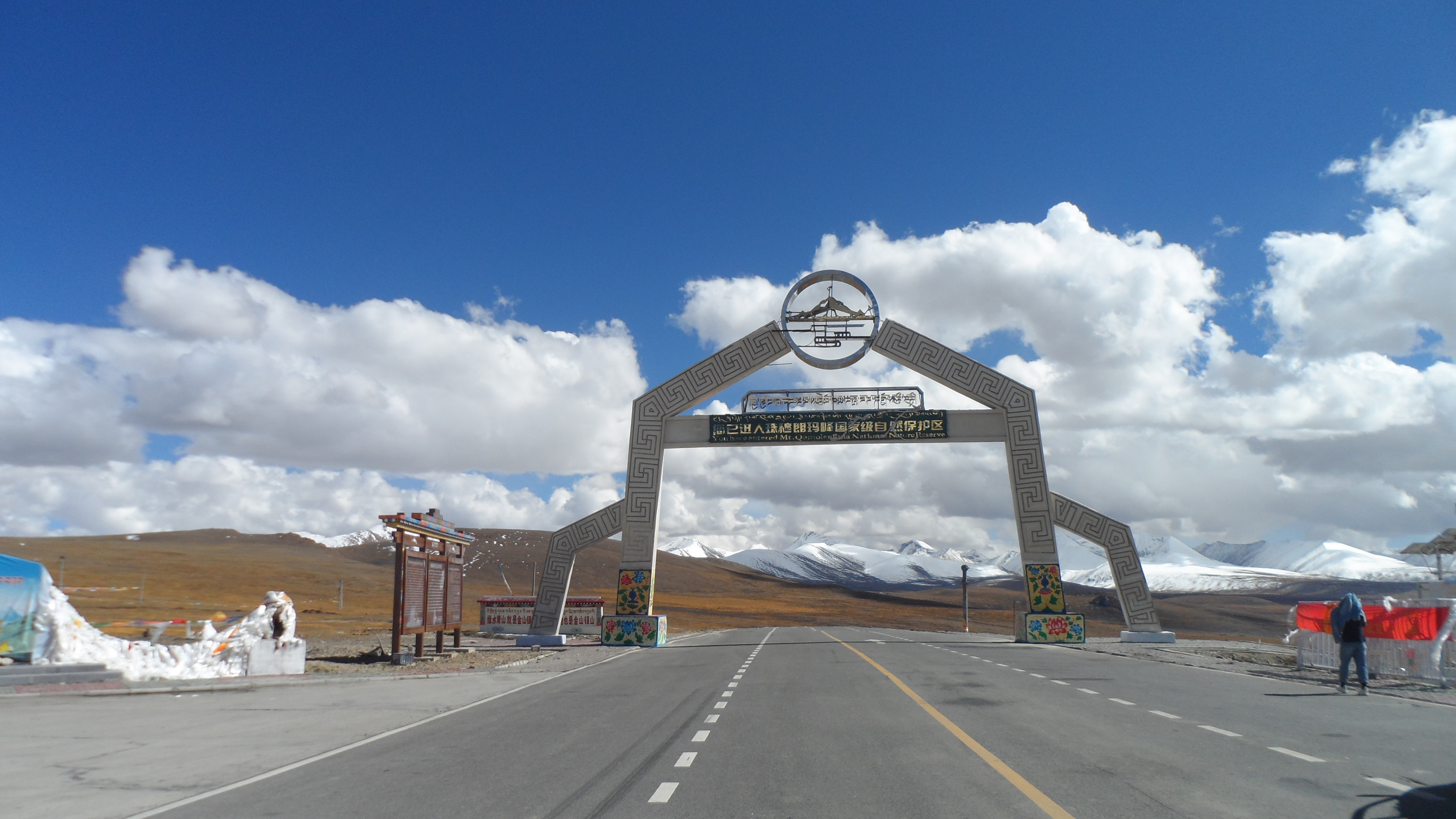
- Entrance Gate of the National Park

- Location within China
- Location: Tibet Autonomous Region, China
- Nearest city: Shigatse
- Coordinates: 28°10′52″N 86°48′11″E
- Area: 36,000 km^{2} (14,000 sq mi)
- Max. elevation: Mount Everest; 8,849 m (29,032 ft)
- Established: March 18, 1989

The Qomolangma National Nature Preserve (QNNP), also known as the Chomolungma Nature Reserve (QNP), is a protected area 3.381 million hectares in size in the Tibet Autonomous Region of the People's Republic of China. Located on the Roof of the World ("Qomolangma" is the Tibetan name for Mount Everest), the QNNP was one of the first nature preserves in the world to be administered and protected entirely by local volunteers. Through their continued efforts, significant achievements have been made in halting rampant deforestation, unregulated tourism and illegal hunting of rare wildlife in the Qomolangma region. Active reforestation and garbage collection programs have also been undertaken to restore the environment.

The protected area, initially named Qomolangma Nature Preserve, was created on March 18, 1989, at the Tibet regional level. Support from then-Governor of Tibet, Hu Jintao, was instrumental in shaping the community-based management design summarized below and also pushing through the landscape level size (in 1983, QNP was the largest nature reserve in Asia). In 1993, the State Council of China elevated its protection to the national level and the QNP became QNNP.

== Physical Aspects ==
The QNNP contains along its border with Nepal four of the world's six highest mountains: Everest, Lhotse, Makalu, and Cho Oyu. Also in this preserve is Shishapangma, the 14th highest in the world and the only eight-thousander peak exclusively in China. The preserve holds Rongbuk Monastery, the highest monastery in the world at 4,500 meters and the highest agricultural fields in the world at 4,300 meters. In addition, the preserve has key pilgrimage sites for Tibetan Buddhism's most famous poet saint, Milarepa.

The contiguous trans-border protected area that has become appended to the QNNP links with five protected areas in Nepal. These are Makalu-Barun National Park, Sagarmatha National Park, Langtang National Park, Manaslu Conservation Area, and Annapurna Conservation Area encompassing a total area of protected ecology greater than the land area of Switzerland—conserving multiple Himalayan ecosystems from the very wet to the very dry and from 1,000 feet of vertical elevation to 29,000 feet. Not adjacent by easy migratory distance away from the QNNP are significant protected areas in Sikkim, India, as well as the country of Bhutan which has over 40% of its land area protected.

== Management ==
QNNP is distinctive because no warden force protects its natural and cultural treasures. Management is by local communities, especially the governments of the four counties that comprise the preserve (Tingri, Dinjie, Nyalam, Kyirong) with a Management Bureau in Shigatse, the prefecture headquarters. The four counties have a population estimated at over 90,000 people. The official data sheet provided by the QNNP administration reports over 2,000 species of plants, 53 species of mammals, 206 species of birds, eight species of amphibians, 10 species of fish. Forty-seven species of rare and endangered plants and animals.

While the norm in community-based conservation has been co-management by science and traditional peoples under a separate management structure for conservation, the QNNP represents another model where science and traditional join in political administration and there is no separate conservation administration.

Village volunteers known as Pendebas (Tibetan for "workers who benefit the village") are trained in primary health, nutrition, and kitchen gardens, conservation concepts and management. Most of the 230 villages in the QNNP have sent at least one village member to be trained as a Pendeba. Continuing development of the Pendebas is being led by Tsering Norbu and the QNNP-based Pendeba Society, one of the few nonprofit organizations in rural Tibet Autonomous Region.

== Formation ==
The Qomolangma National Nature Preserve was proposed in 1985 by Daniel C. Taylor to the Tibetan regional and Chinese national governments when essentially no protected land was designated in the Tibet Autonomous Region. As the primary external advisers for two decades, Daniel C. Taylor and Chun-Wuei Su Chien worked first through The Mountain Institute and then through Future Generations to provide management assistance in scientific, social development, historical renovation, ecotourism planning, and initiation of the Pendeba Program.

Subsequent to formation of the QNNP, with the new land management model, land area of the Tibet Autonomous Region under national and regional protected status expanded steadily, utilizing the QNNP management model where local county administrations enforce the conservation policies and where people engage in conservation management as part of their livelihood activities. Presently, there are 23 national-level and regional-level designated nature reserves that collectively protect 42% of the region's land area.

It is included in the Sacred Himalayan Landscape.

== In popular culture ==
- "Quomolangma" is a song on the 2013 Inform - Educate - Entertain album by Public Service Broadcasting, a British art rock band.
