= Takargo (Nepal) =

Mountain in Nepal

- Dragker Go
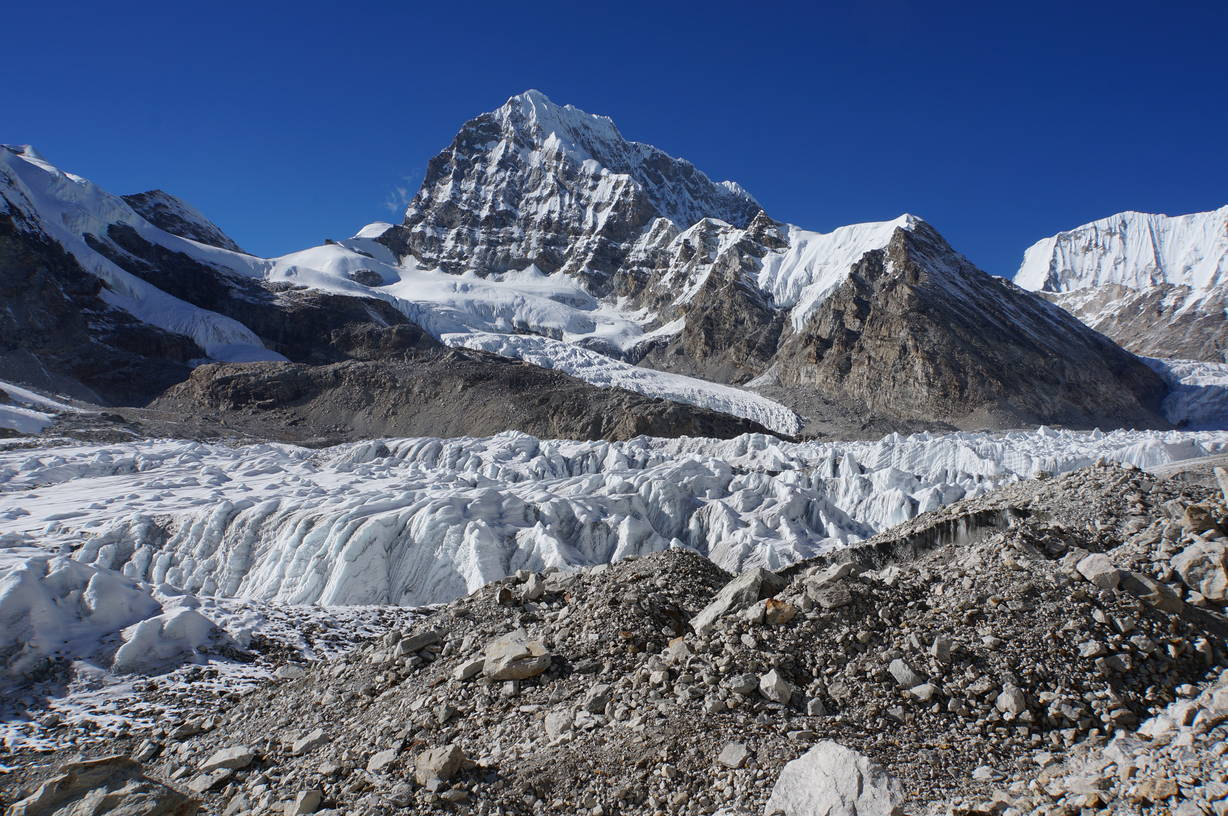
- Southeast aspect

Highest point
- Elevation: 6,771 m (22,215 ft)
- Prominence: 896 m (2,940 ft)
- Parent peak: Tengi Ragi Tau (6,943 m)
- Isolation: 4.66 km (2.90 mi)
- Coordinates: 27°52′33″N 86°30′33″E

Geography
- Location within Nepal
- Interactive map of Takargo
- Country: Nepal
- Province: Bagmati
- District: Dolakha
- Protected area: Gaurishankar Conservation Area
- Parent range: Himalayas; Rolwaling Himal

Climbing
- First ascent: 2010

Takargo, also known as Thakar Go or Dragker Go, is a mountain in Nepal.

== Description ==
Takargo is a 6,771-metre (22,215-foot) summit in the Nepalese Himalayas. It is set in the Dolakha District of Bagmati Province. Precipitation runoff from the mountain's slopes drains to the Tamakoshi River via Rolwāliṅ Khola. Topographic relief is significant as the summit rises over 2,200 metres (7,218 ft) above Tsho Rolpa in three kilometres (1.9 mi). The first ascent of the summit was achieved on March 12, 2010, by David Gottlieb and Joe Puryear via the east face.

== Climate ==
Based on the Köppen climate classification, Takargo is located in a tundra climate zone with cold, snowy winters, and cool summers. Weather systems coming off the Bay of Bengal are forced upwards by the Himalaya mountains (orographic lift), causing heavy precipitation in the form of rainfall and snowfall. Mid-June through early-August is the monsoon season. The months of April, May, September, October, and November offer the most favorable weather for viewing or climbing this peak.

== Gallery ==
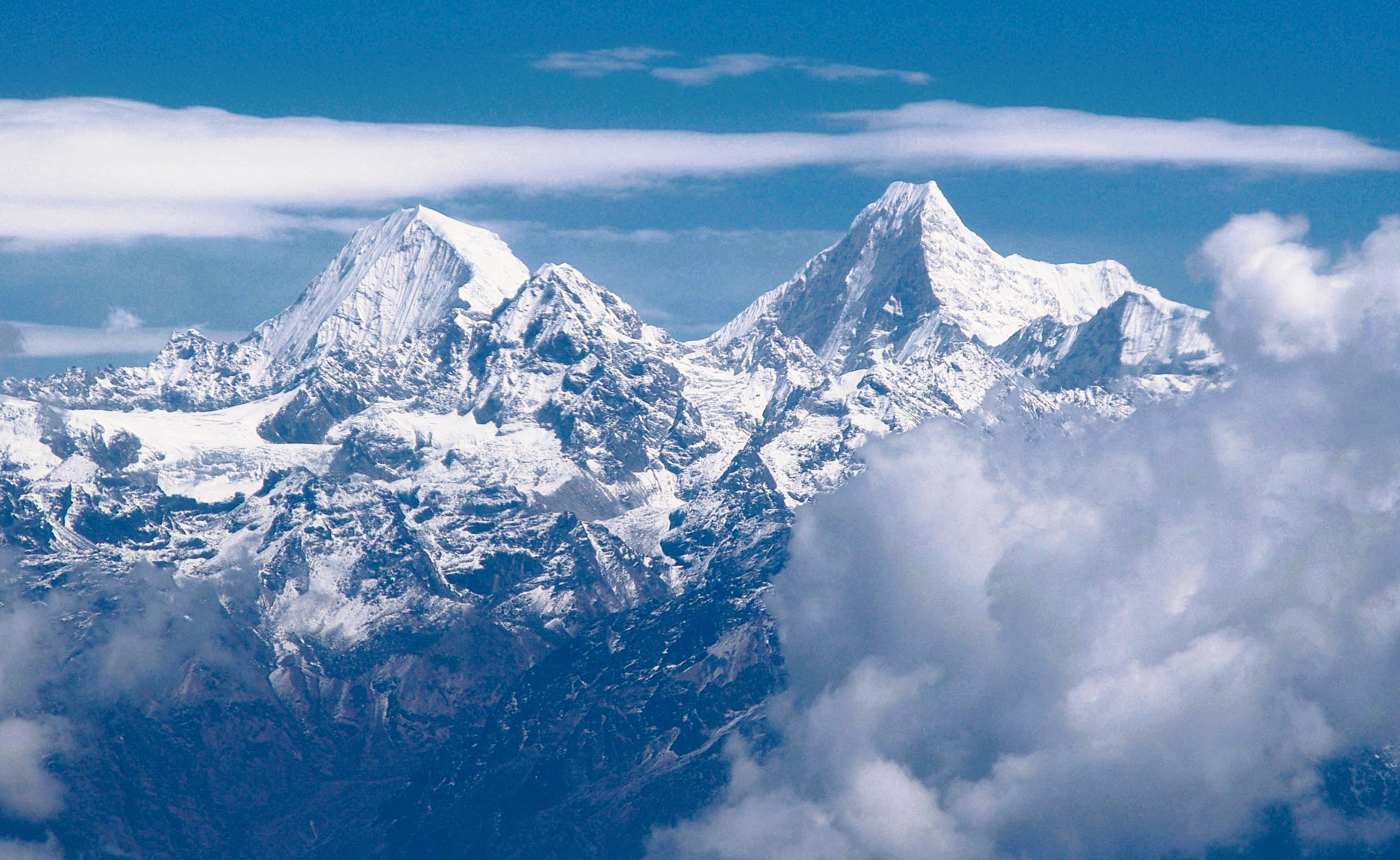
Tsoboje (left) and Takargo (right). Aerial view from south.

== See also ==
- Geology of the Himalayas
