= Likhu Chuli =

Mountain in Nepal

- Pig Pherago Shar
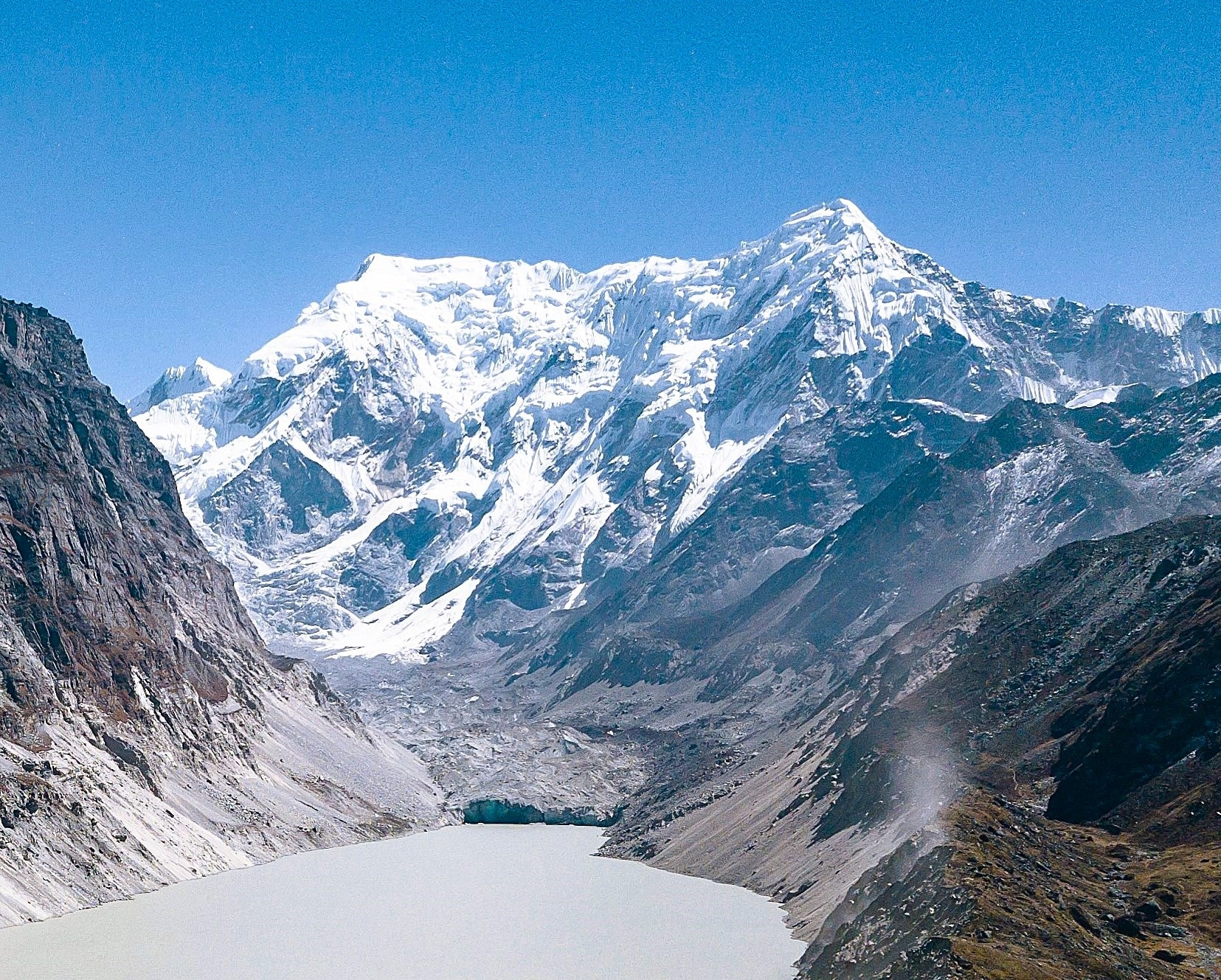
- Northwest aspect

Highest point
- Elevation: 6,719 m (22,044 ft)
- Prominence: 531 m (1,742 ft)
- Parent peak: Tengi Ragi Tau (6,938 m)
- Isolation: 5.16 km (3.21 mi)
- Coordinates: 27°48′40″N 86°32′41″E

Geography
- Location within Nepal
- Interactive map of Likhu Chuli
- Country: Nepal
- Province: Bagmati / Koshi
- District: Dolakha / Solukhumbu / Ramechhap
- Protected area: Sagarmatha National Park; Gaurishankar Conservation Area
- Parent range: Himalayas; Mahalangur Himal

Climbing
- First ascent: 2013 by Ines Papert

Likhu Chuli, also known as Pig Pherago Shar, is a mountain in Nepal.

== Description ==
Likhu Chuli is a 6,719-metre (22,044-foot) glaciated summit on the southwest boundary of Sagarmatha National Park in the Nepalese Himalayas. It is set on the triple boundary point shared by the Dolakha District, Ramechhap District, and the Solukhumbu District. Precipitation runoff from the mountain's northeast slope drains into tributaries of the Dudh Koshi, whereas the south slope drains to the Likhu Khola, and the northwest slope drains to the Tamakoshi River via Rolwāliṅ Khola. Topographic relief is significant as the summit rises 1,750 metres (5,740 ft) above the Drolambao Glacier in two kilometres (1.2 mi). The first ascent of the summit was achieved on November 13, 2013, by Ines Papert (solo), via the north flank. The mountain has a lower west summit (6,659 m) known as Likhu Chuli II, or Pig Pherago Nup, which was first climbed on October 21, 1960, by Alain Barbezat, Cecile Barbezat, and Nawang Dorje.

== Climate ==
Based on the Köppen climate classification, Likhu Chuli is located in a tundra climate zone with cold, snowy winters, and cool summers. Weather systems coming off the Bay of Bengal are forced upwards by the Himalaya mountains (orographic lift), causing heavy precipitation in the form of rainfall and snowfall. Mid-June through early-August is the monsoon season. The months of April, May, September, October, and November offer the most favorable weather for viewing or climbing this peak.

== Gallery ==
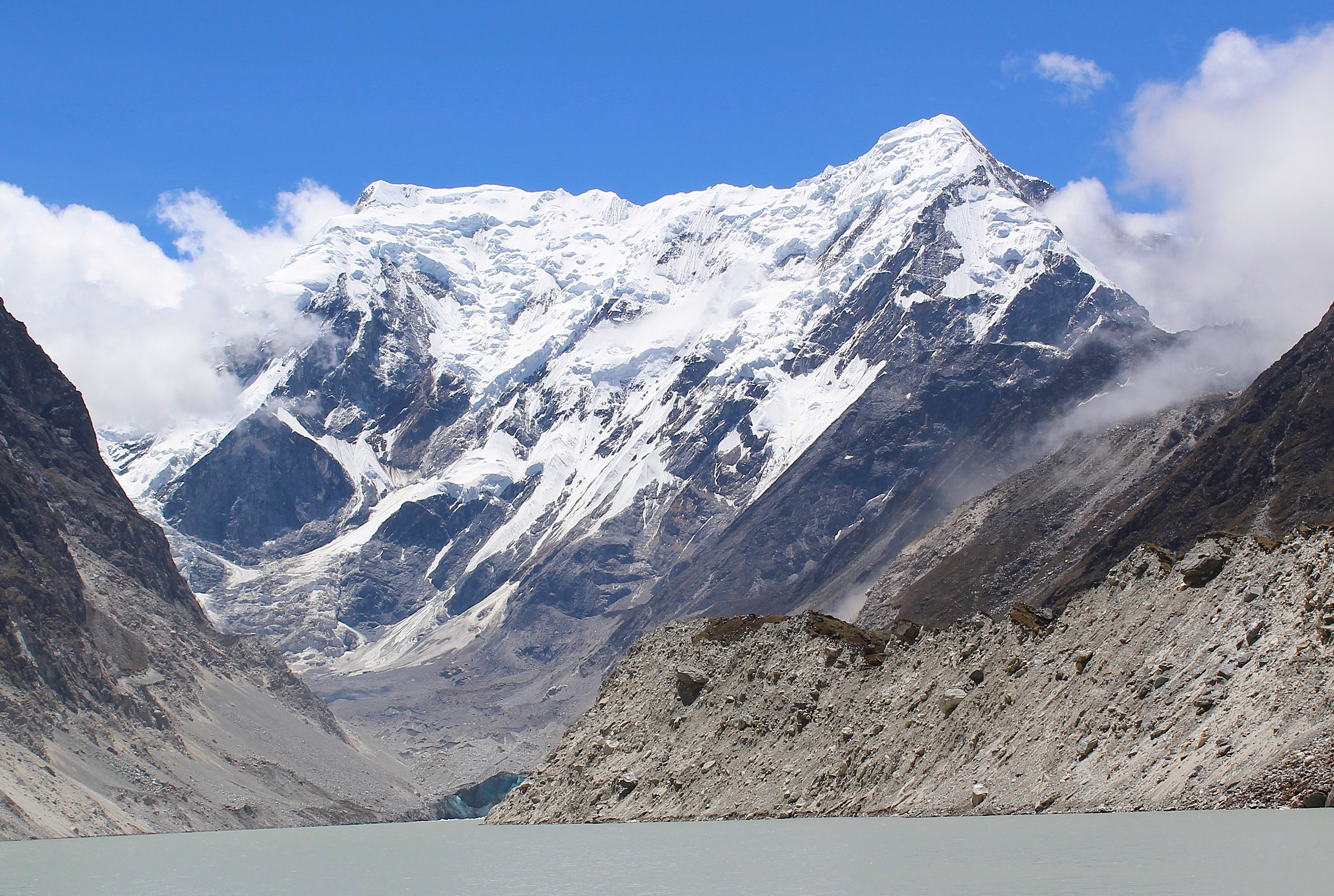
Northwest aspect of Likhu Chuli viewed from Tsho Rolpa glacial lake

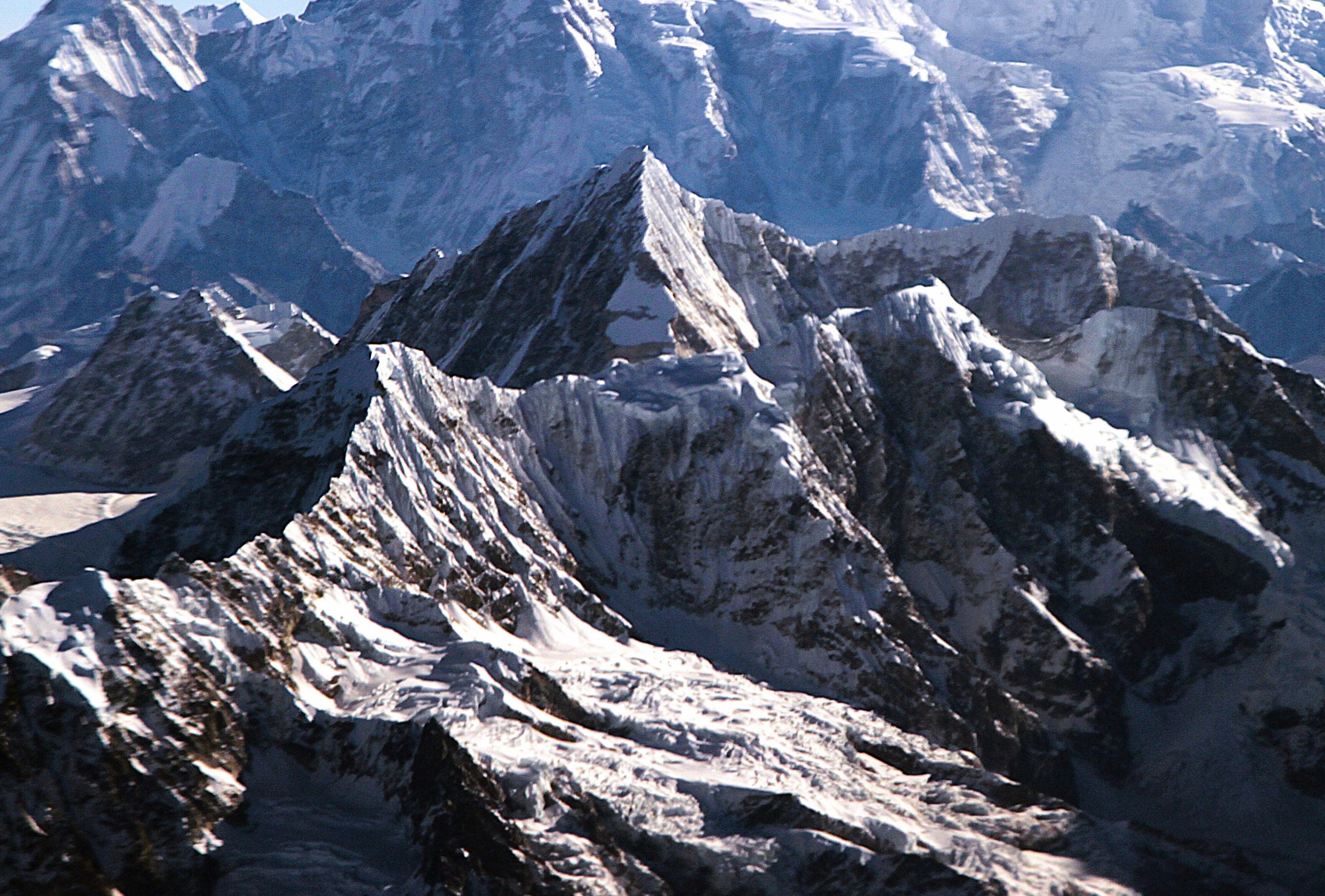
Aerial view of south aspect of double-summit Likhu Chuli, with Tengi Ragi Tau centered behind.

== See also ==
- Geology of the Himalayas
