= Kanchenjunga Conservation Area =

Protected area in Nepal

- Nepali: कञ्चनजङ्घा संरक्षण क्षेत्र
- IUCN category VI (protected area with sustainable use of natural resources)
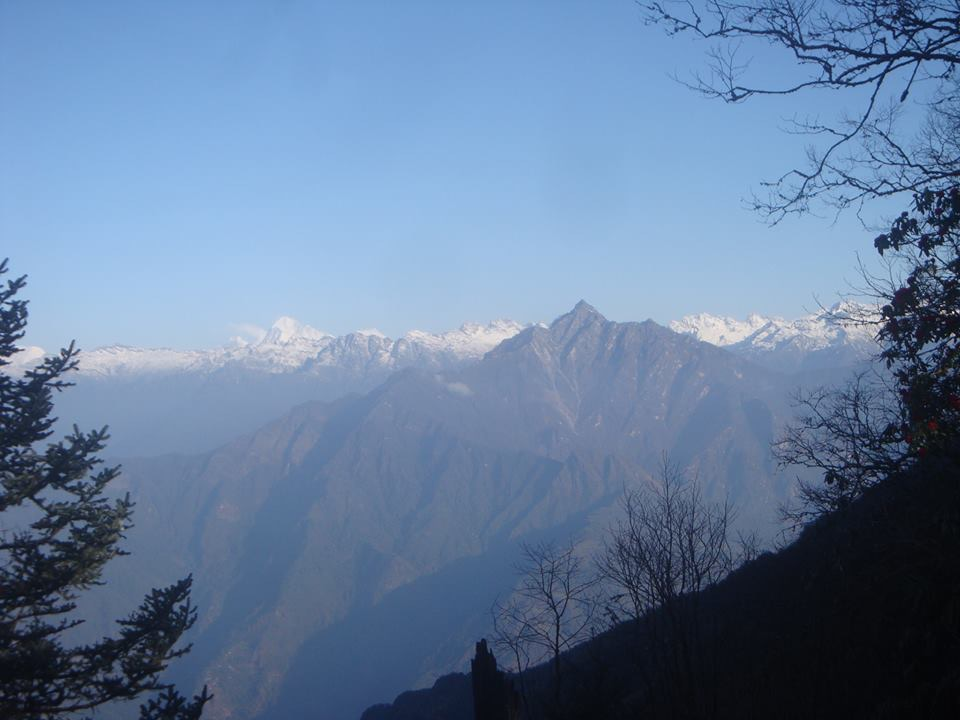
- On route to the Pathibhara Devi Temple

- Location within Koshi Province Location within Nepal Location within South Asia
- Interactive map of Kanchenjunga Conservation Area
- Location: Nepal
- Coordinates: 27.7155°N 87.9282°E
- Area: 2,035 km^{2} (786 sq mi)
- Established: 1997
- Governing body: Department of National Parks and Wildlife Conservation

Kanchenjunga Conservation Area is a protected area in the Himalayas of eastern Nepal that was established in 1997. It covers 2,035 km^{2} (786 sq mi) in the Taplejung District and comprises two peaks of Kanchenjunga. In the north it adjoins the Qomolangma National Nature Preserve in Tibet, and in the east the Khangchendzonga National Park in Sikkim. It borders the Sankhuwasabha District and part of the Sacred Himalayan Landscape.

== History ==
The Kanchenjunga Conservation Area was designated during 1997.

== Fauna ==
Some animals living here are the snow leopard and blood pheasant.

In April 2012, a leopard cat was recorded by a camera trap at an elevation of 4,474 m (14,678 ft). This record constitutes the highest known record to date. A melanistic leopard was photographed at an elevation of 4,300 m (14,100 ft) in May 2012. A yellow-throated marten has been recorded up to 4,510 m (14,800 ft) elevation in alpine meadow.
