= Gaurishankar Conservation Area =

Protected area in the Himalayas of Nepal

- Nepali: गौरीशंकर संरक्षण क्षेत्र
- IUCN category VI (protected area with sustainable use of natural resources)
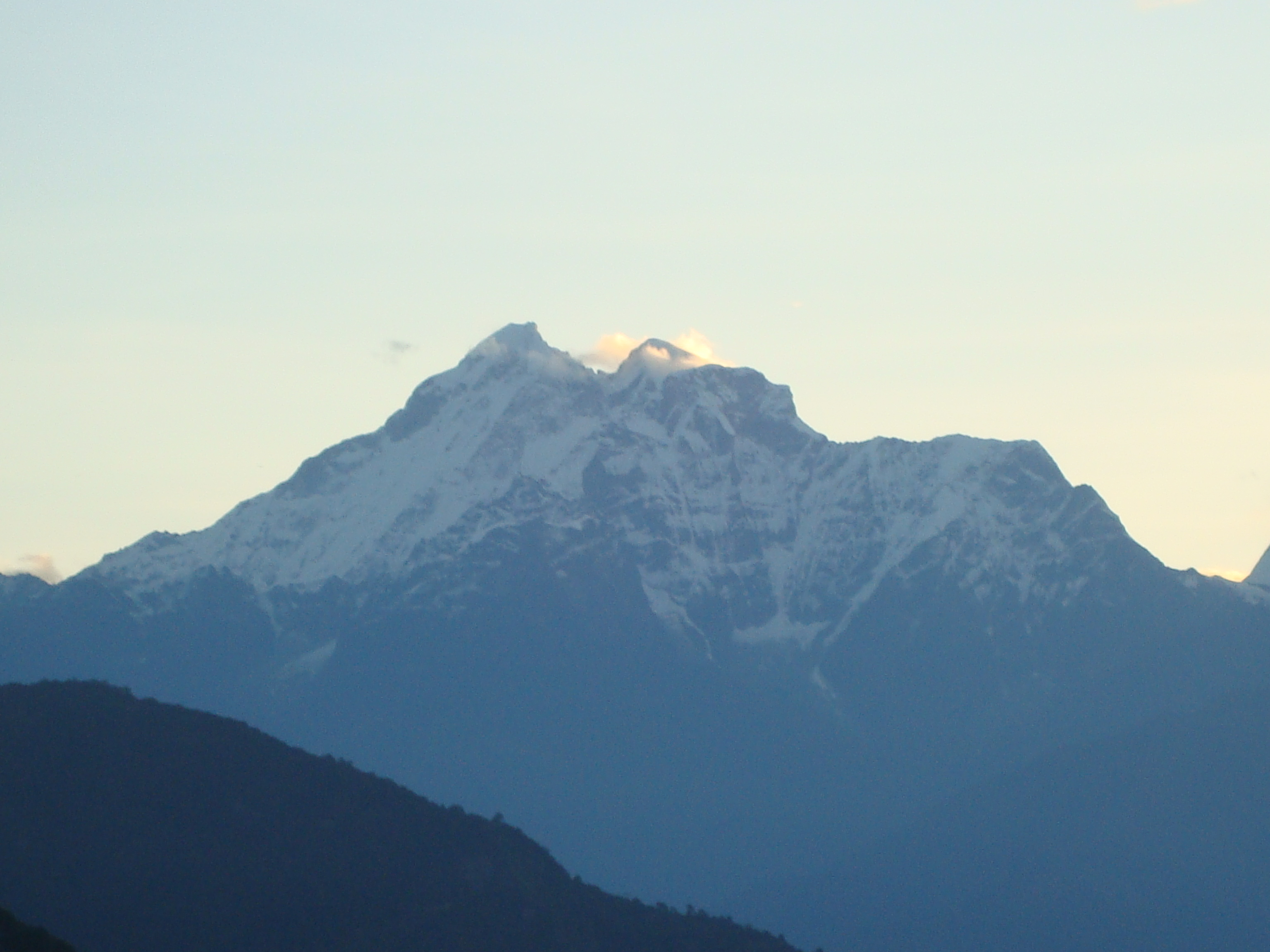
- View of Gaurishankar

- Location within Bagmati Province Location within Nepal Location within South Asia
- Location: Nepal
- Coordinates: 27°52′N 86°11′E
- Area: 2,179 km^{2} (841 sq mi)
- Established: 11 January 2010
- Governing body: Department of National Parks and Wildlife Conservation

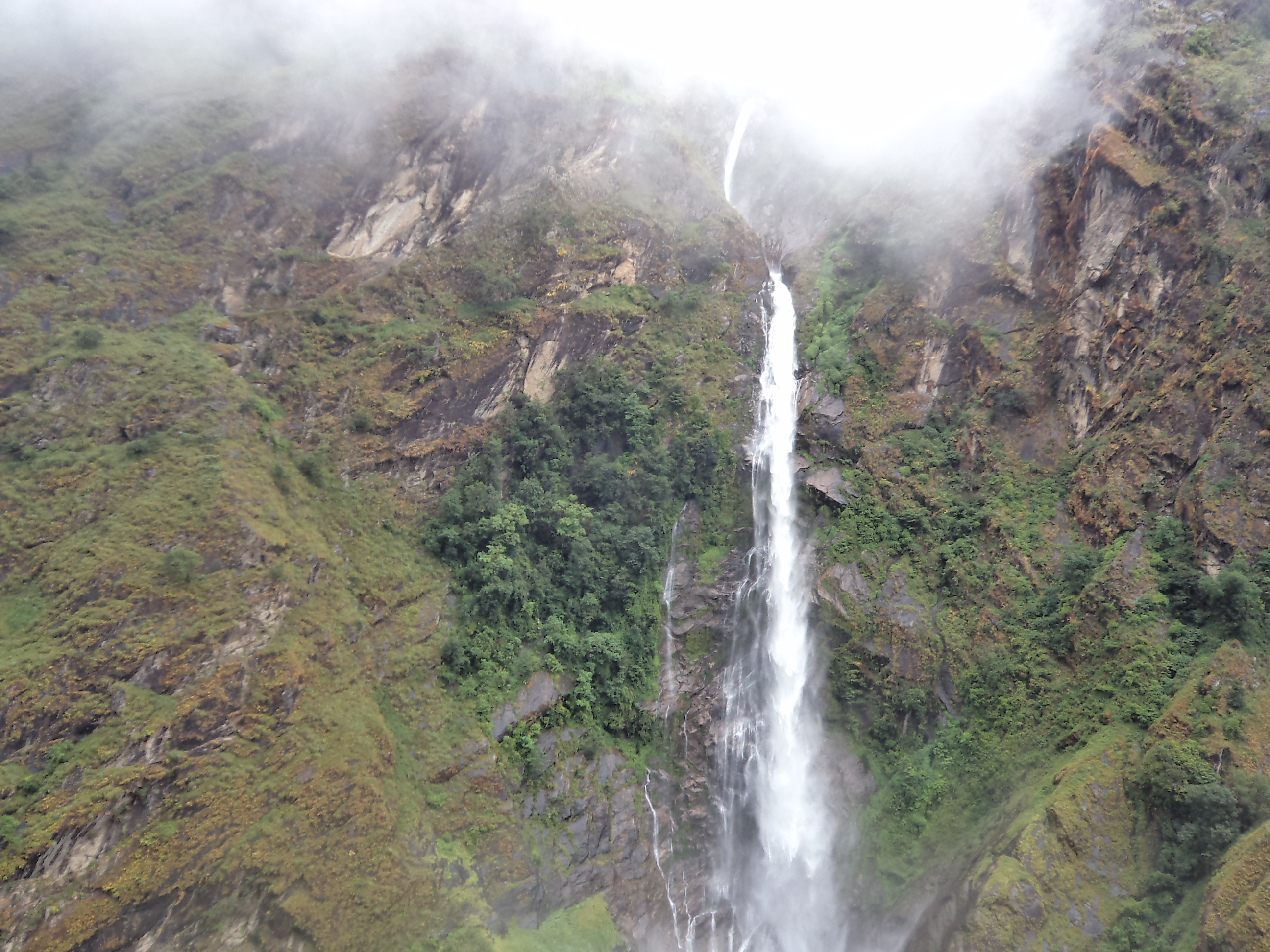
Waterfall on the way to Lamabagar

Gaurishankar Conservation Area is a protected area in the Himalayas of Nepal that was established in January 2010, covering 2,179 km^{2} (841 sq mi) in the Ramechhap, Dolakha and Sindhupalchok districts and encompassing 22 Village Development Committees. It is contiguous with Tibet in the north and a part of the Sacred Himalayan Landscape. The protected area has the Langtang and Sagarmatha National Parks. In 2010, the Government of Nepal handed over the management of Gaurishankar Conservation Area to National Trust for Nature Conservation for 20 years, which has been managing the area through its Gaurishankar Conservation Area Project.

== History ==
In January 2010, the Federation of Community Forest Users, Nepal opposed establishing a conservation area.

== Conservation Area Boundary ==
The Gaurishankar Conservation Area encompasses 22 VDCs, covering three districts. In Ramechhap, it includes the Chuchure and Gumdel VDCs. The Shyama, Suri, Chankhu, Marbu, Khare, Orang, Bulung, Laduk, Chilankha, Aalampu, Bigu, Kalinchok, Lamabagar and Gaurishankar VDCs of Dolakha also fall within its boundaries. And six VDCs of the Sindhupalchok District - Ghorthali, Marming, Listikot, Tatopani, Fulpingkatti and Gumba - are now part of the conservation area.

== Flora and fauna ==
The Gaurishankar Conservation Area is rich in bio-diversity. A total of 16 varieties of vegetation have been identified in the area, including forests of Pinus roxburghii, Schima-Castanopsis, Alnus, Pinus wallichiana, Pinus patula, Rhododendron, Quercus lanata and Temperate mountain oak forest.

=== Mammals ===
The Gaurishankar Conservation Area's mammalian population totals 34 species, including snow leopard, Himalayan black bear and Himalayan thar. One of the rarest mammals in the area is the red panda. In February 2019, an Asian golden cat together with Assam macaque, masked palm civet, Himalayan goral, Himalayan serow and Indian muntjac were recorded in Gaurishankar Conservation Area.

=== Birds ===
A total of 235 species of birds have been recorded from the Gaurishankar Conservation Area.

== See also ==
- Gaurishankar
- Sun Kosi
- Sherpa people
