= Amphu Gyabjen =

Mountain in Nepal

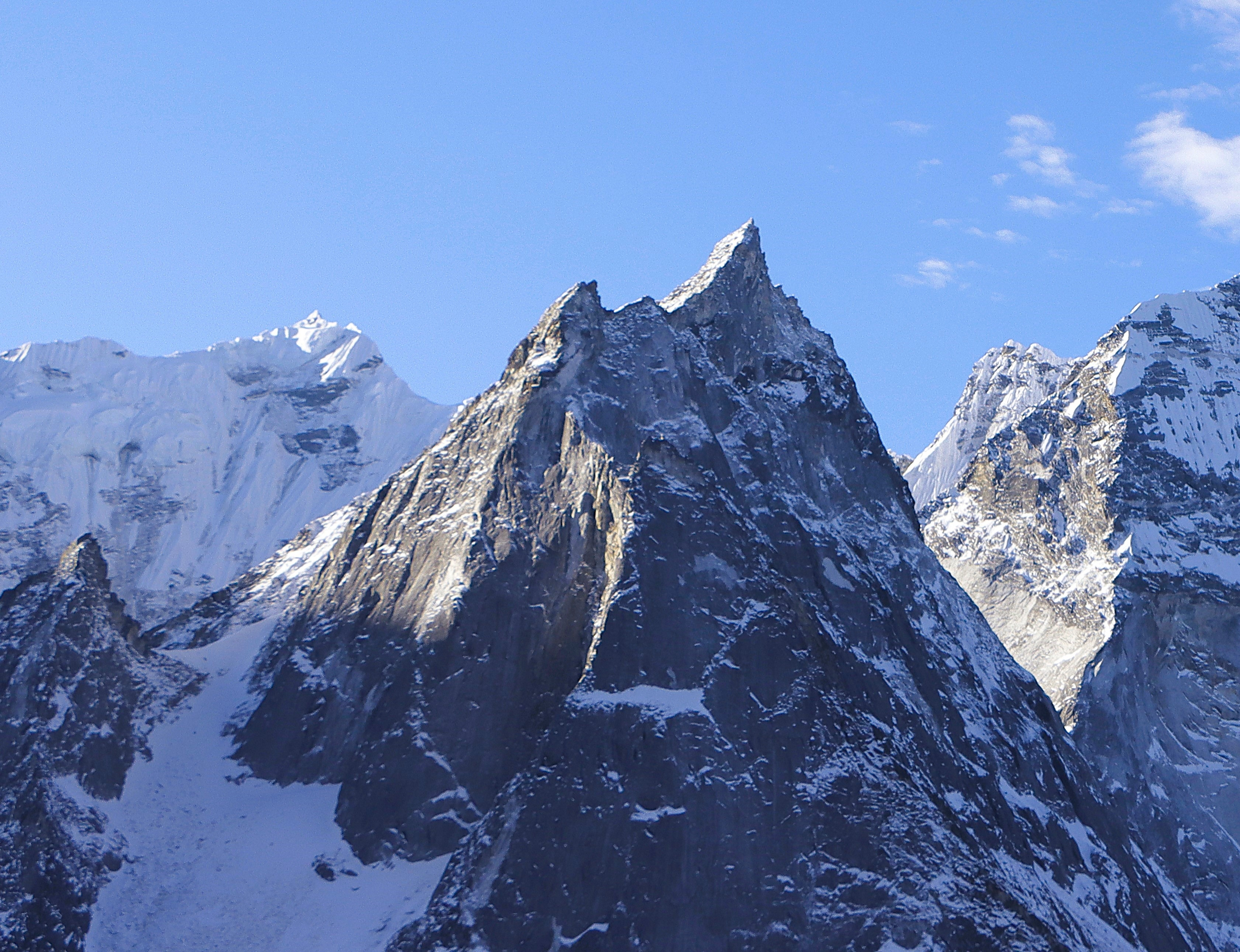
- North aspect

Highest point
- Elevation: 5,647 m (18,527 ft)
- Prominence: 305 m (1,001 ft)
- Parent peak: Ama Dablam
- Isolation: 2.25 km (1.40 mi)
- Coordinates: 27°52′52″N 86°52′05″E

Geography
- Location within Nepal
- Interactive map of Amphu Gyabjen
- Location: Khumbu
- Country: Nepal
- Province: Koshi
- District: Solukhumbu
- Protected area: Sagarmatha National Park
- Parent range: Himalayas; Mahalangur Himal

Climbing
- First ascent: 1953

Amphu Gyabjen, also spelled Amphu Gyabien, is a mountain in Nepal.

== Description ==
Amphu Gyabjen is a 5,647-metre (18,527-foot) summit in the Nepalese Himalayas. It is situated two kilometres (1.2 mi) north of Ama Dablam in Sagarmatha National Park. Precipitation runoff from the mountain's slopes drains into tributaries of the Dudh Koshi. Topographic relief is significant as the summit rises over 800 metres (2,625 ft) in less than one kilometre (0.62 mi). The first ascent of the summit was made in 1953 by John Hunt, Tom Bourdillon, Wilfrid Noyce, and Michael Ward during the 1953 British Mount Everest expedition.

== Climate ==
Based on the Köppen climate classification, Amphu Gyabjen is located in a tundra climate zone with cold, snowy winters, and cool summers. Weather systems coming off the Bay of Bengal are forced upwards by the Himalaya mountains (orographic lift), causing heavy precipitation in the form of rainfall and snowfall. Mid-June through early-August is the monsoon season. The months of April, May, September, and October offer the most favorable weather for viewing or climbing this peak.

== Gallery ==
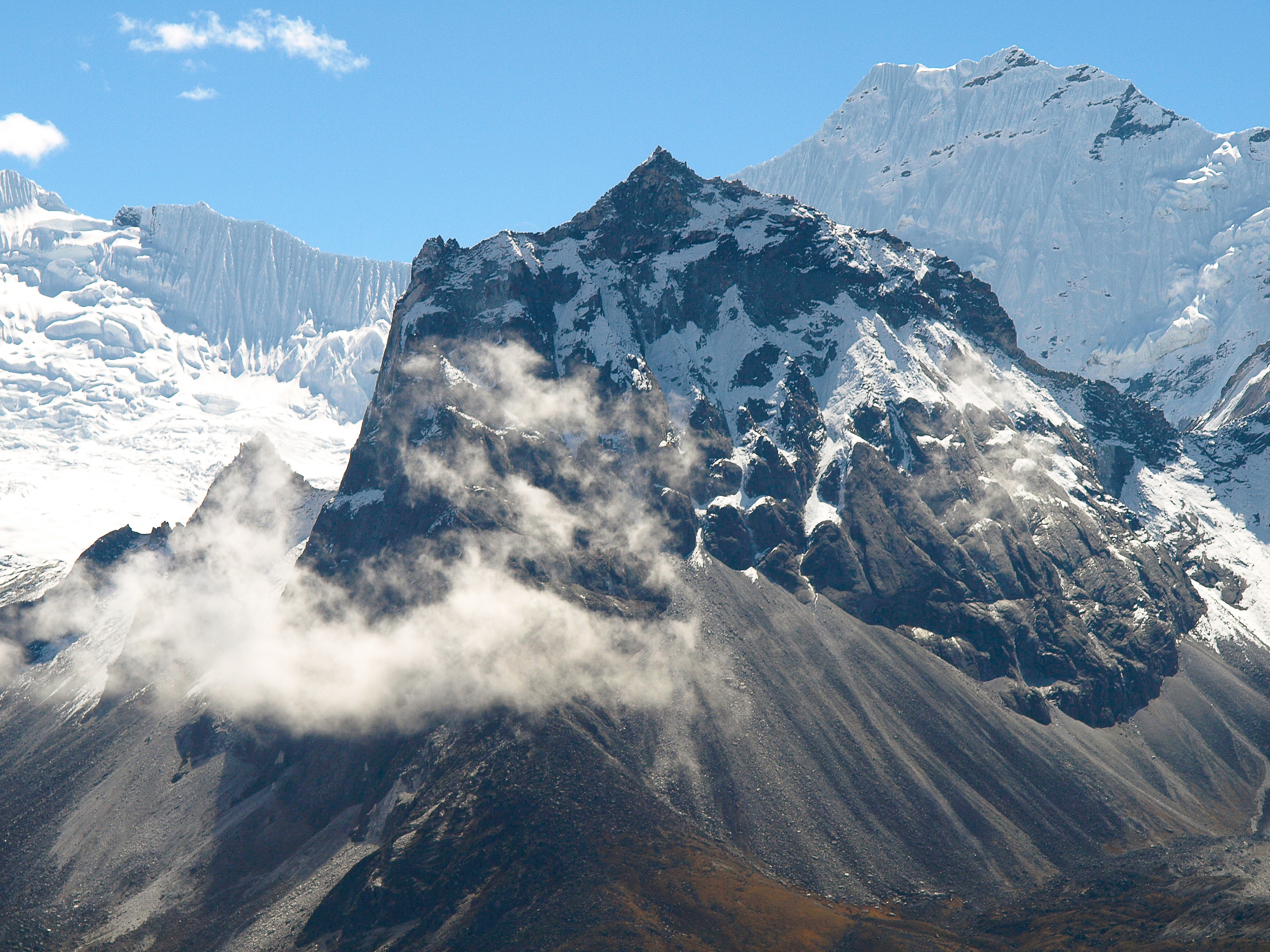
Northwest aspect, with Peak 6402 behind

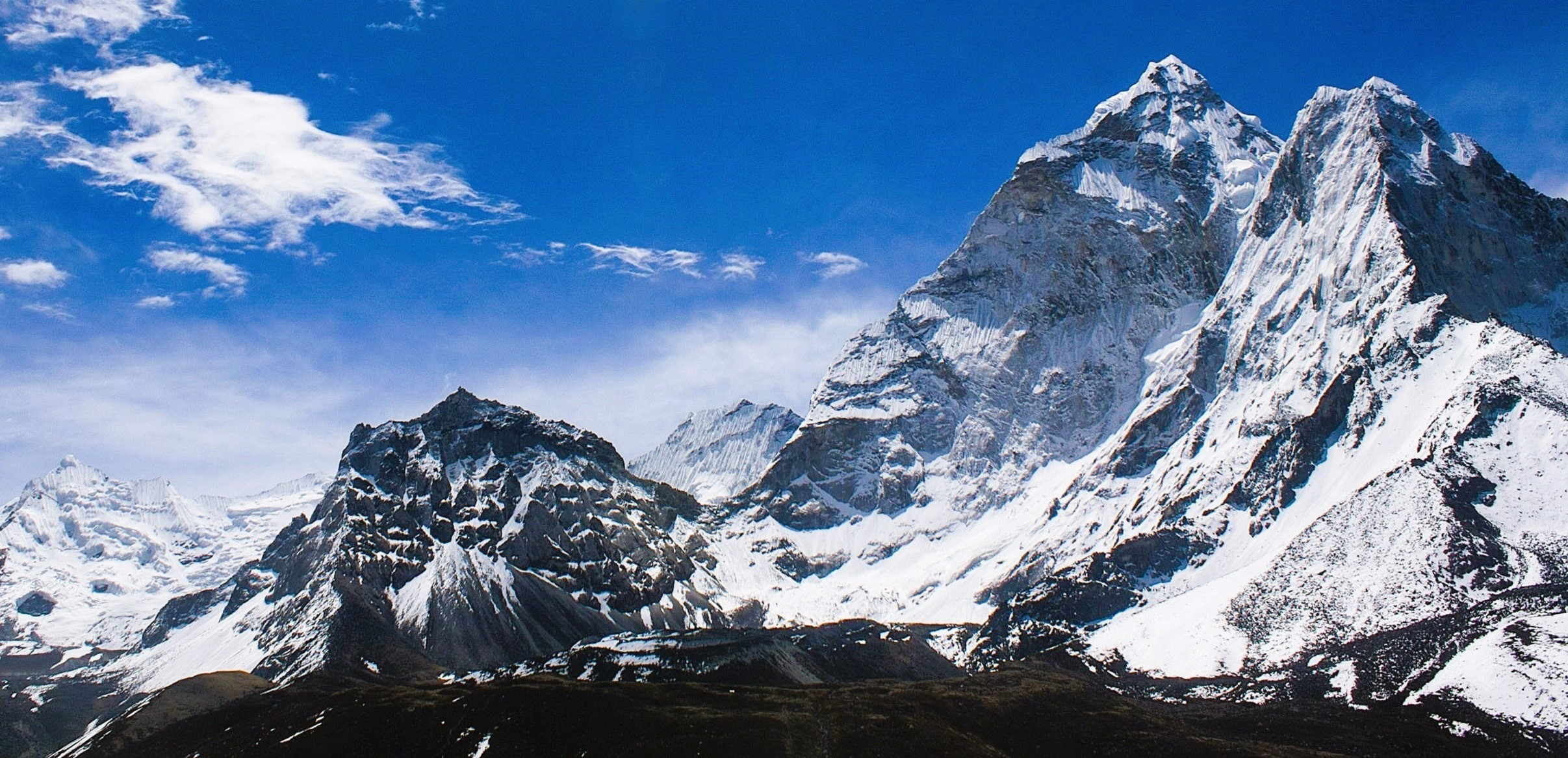
Amphu Gyabjen (left) and Ama Dablam viewed from west.

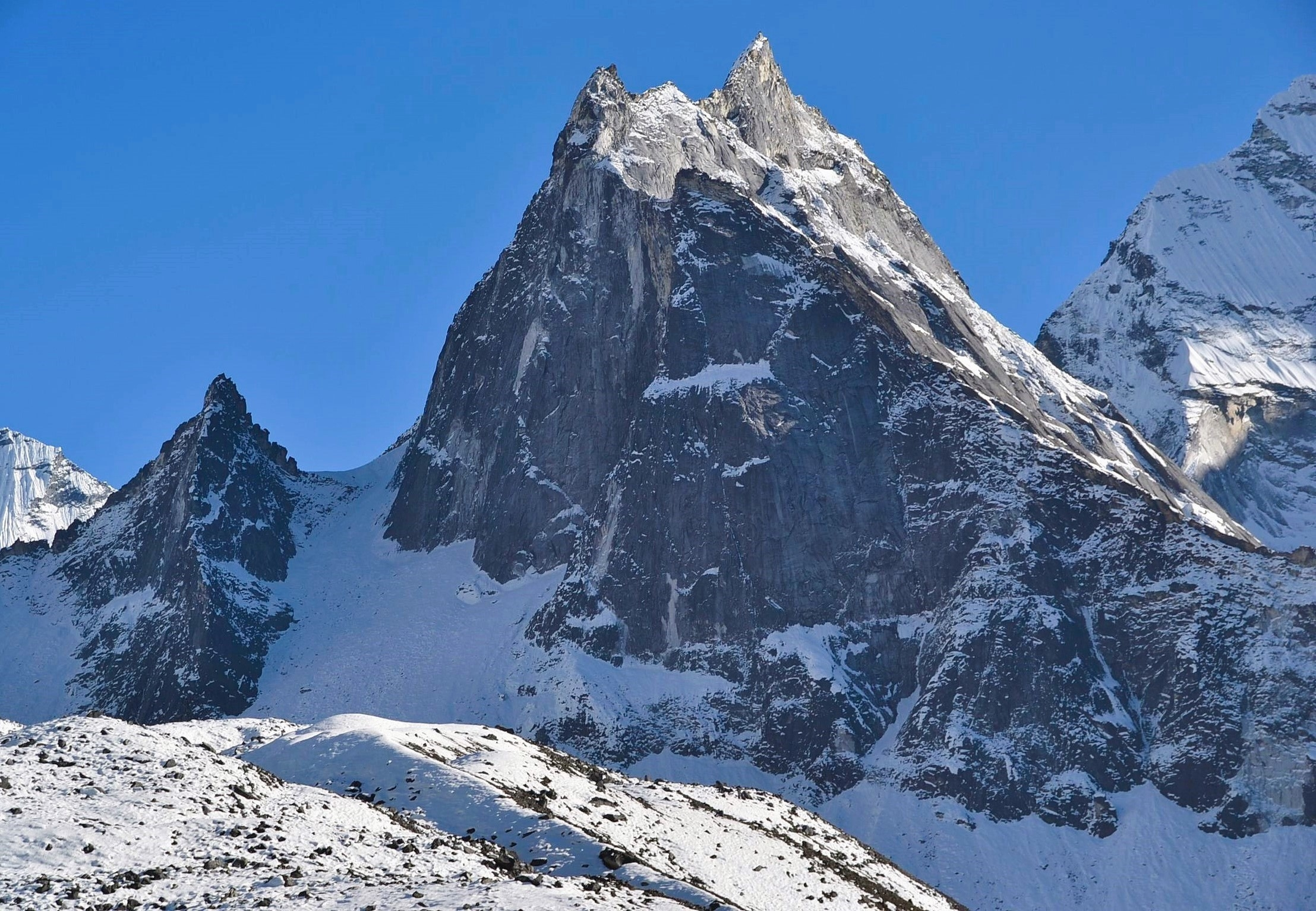
North aspect

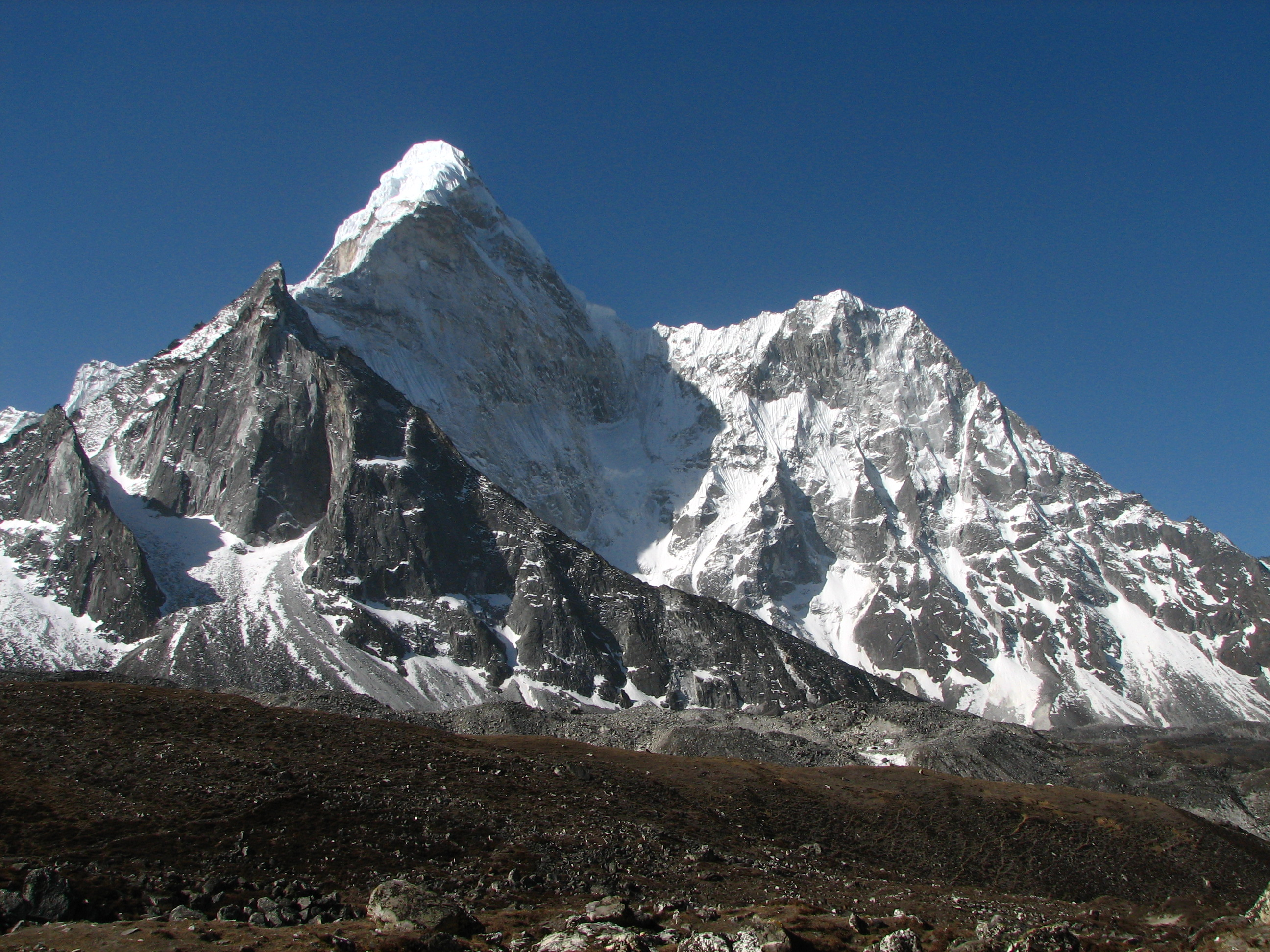
Amphu Gyabjen (left) with Ama Dablam behind

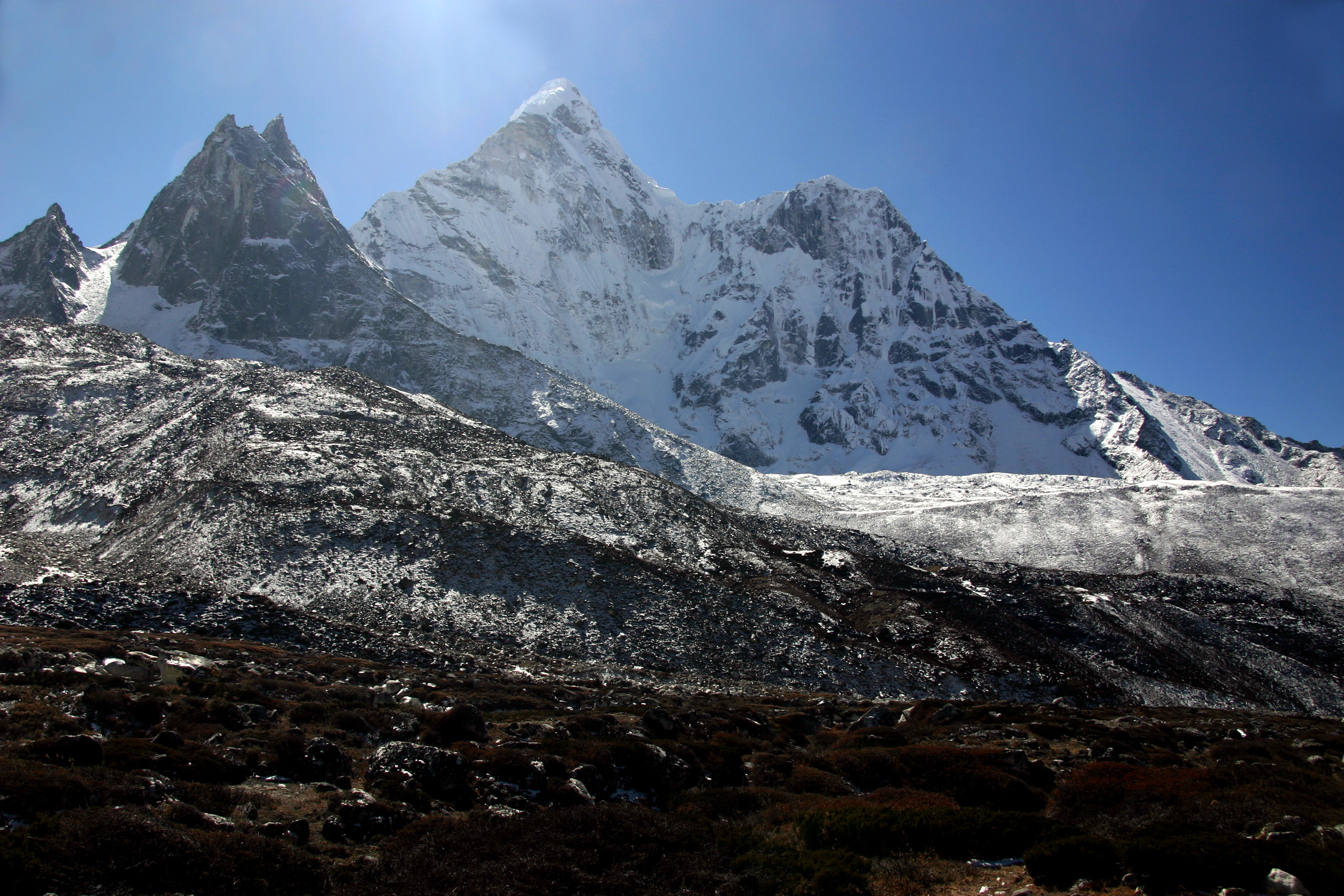
Amphu Gyabjen (left) with Ama Dablam behind

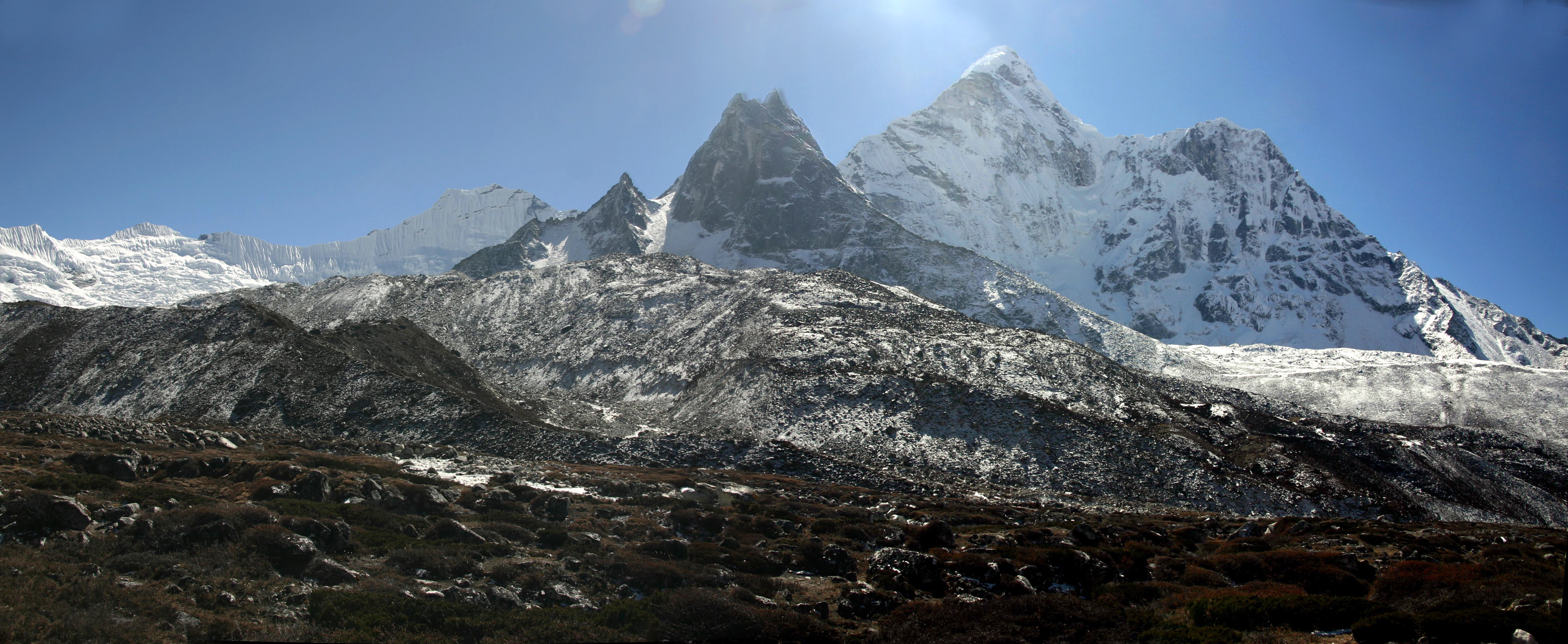
Amphu Gyabjen centered, with Ama Dablam to right

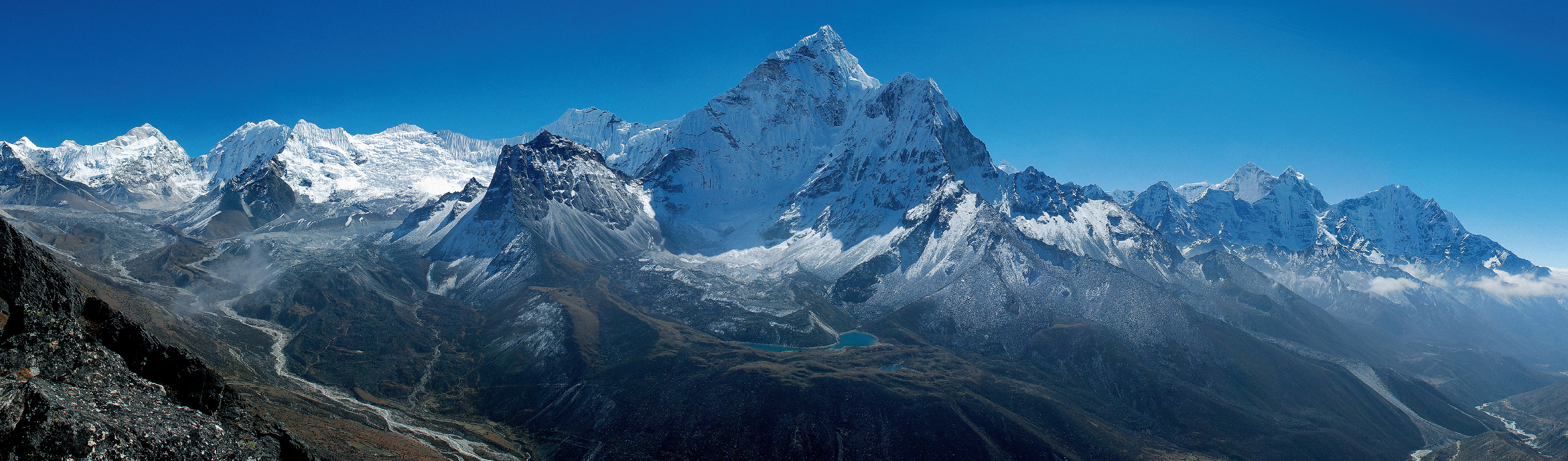
Ama Dablam centered, with Amphu Gyabjen (below, left)

== See also ==
- Geology of the Himalayas
