= Tsoboje =

Mountain in Nepal

- Chobuje
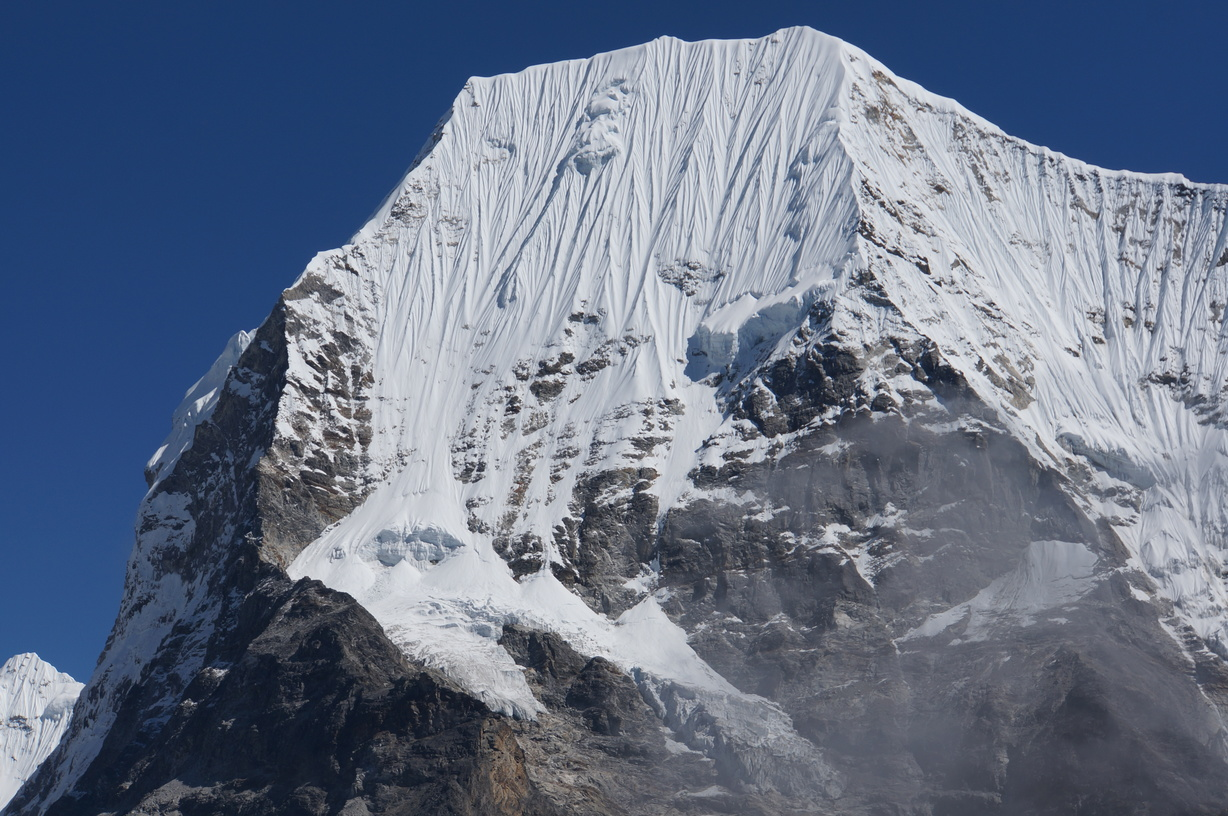
- Southwest aspect

Highest point
- Elevation: 6,685 m (21,932 ft)
- Prominence: 569 m (1,867 ft)
- Parent peak: Takargo
- Isolation: 2.25 km (1.40 mi)
- Coordinates: 27°52′56″N 86°29′30″E

Geography
- Location within Nepal
- Interactive map of Tsoboje
- Country: Nepal
- Province: Bagmati
- District: Dolakha
- Parent range: Himalayas; Rolwaling Himal

Climbing
- First ascent: 1972

Tsoboje, also known as Chobuje or Cho Buje, is a mountain in Nepal.

== Description ==
Tsoboje is a 6,685-metre (21,932-foot) summit in the Nepalese Himalayas. It is set in the Dolakha District of Bagmati Province. Precipitation runoff from the mountain's slopes drains to the Tamakoshi River via Rolwāliṅ Khola. Topographic relief is significant as the summit rises 2,125 metres (6,972 ft) above Tsho Rolpa in two kilometres (1.2 mi). The first ascent of the summit was achieved on April 24, 1972, by Wolfgang Weinzierl, Peter Vogler, Gustav Harder, and Klaus Harder via the east ridge/face. The west face was climbed solo by Mingma Gyalje Sherpa on October 28, 2015. The northwest face was first climbed in October 2021 by Luka Stražar and Nejc Marčič. Slovenians Nejc Marčič and Luka Stražar tackled the vertical icy walls of the Northwest face, while Poland's Wadim Jabłoński and Maciej Kimel ascended the Northeast Pillar.

== Climate ==
Based on the Köppen climate classification, Tsoboje is located in a tundra climate zone with cold, snowy winters, and cool summers. Weather systems coming off the Bay of Bengal are forced upwards by the Himalaya mountains (orographic lift), causing heavy precipitation in the form of rainfall and snowfall. Mid-June through early-August is the monsoon season. The months of April, May, September, October, and November offer the most favorable weather for viewing or climbing this peak.

== Gallery ==
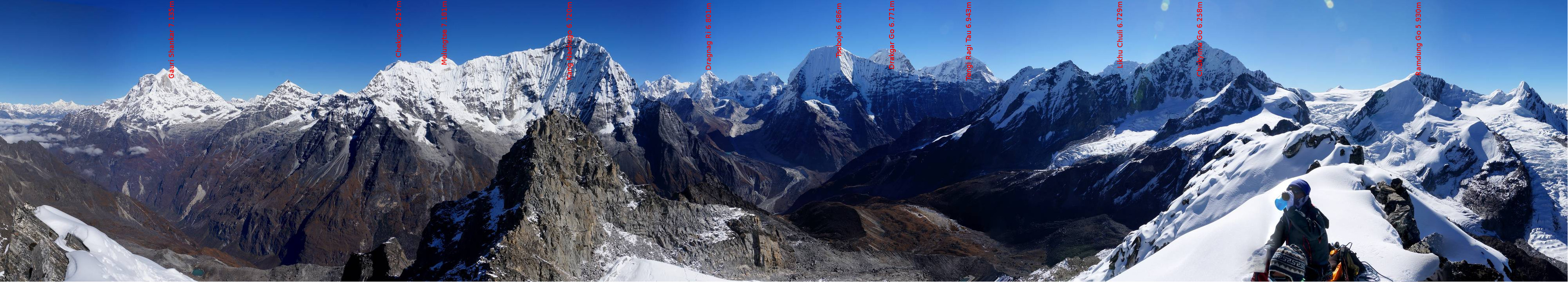
Tsoboje centered

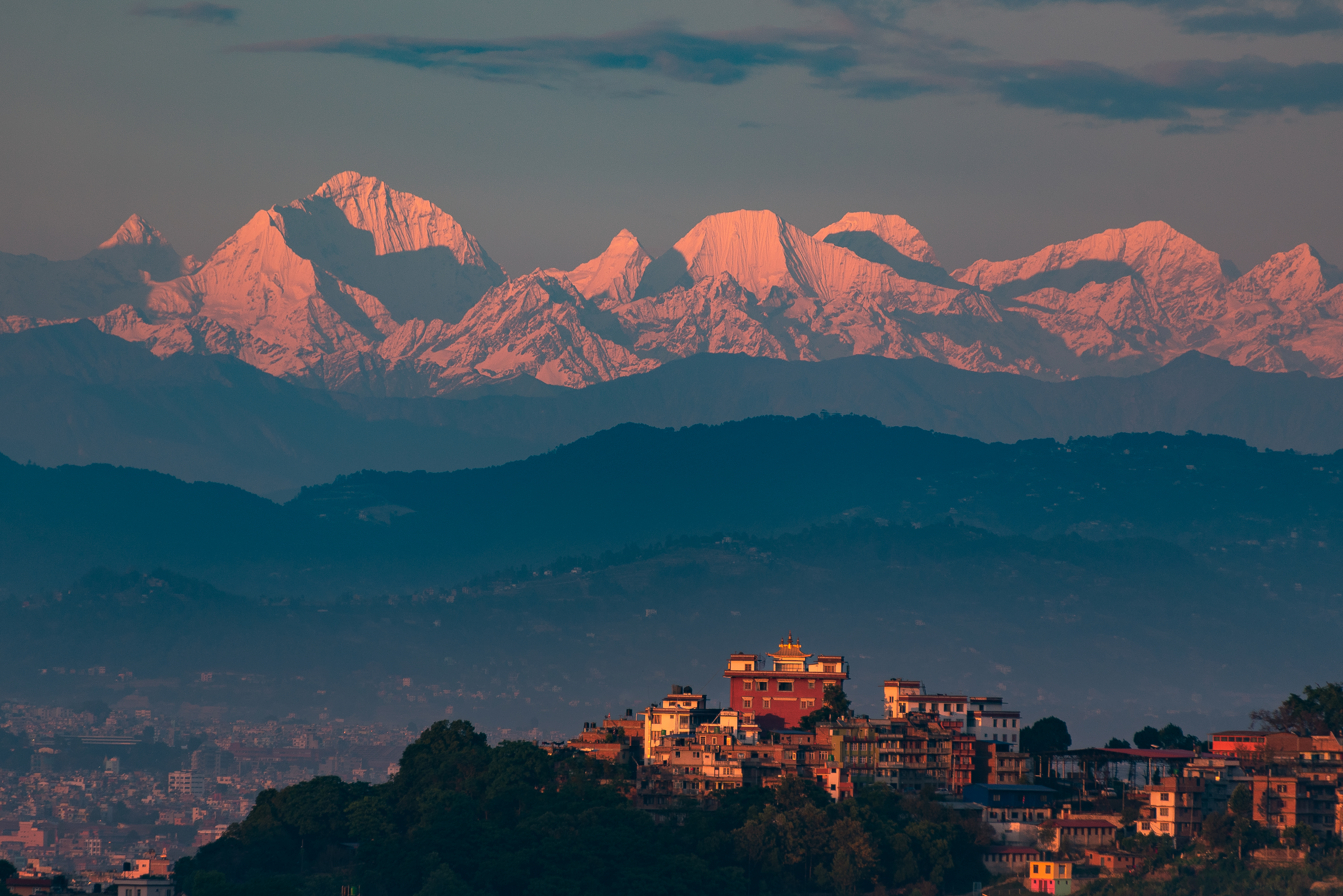
Tsoboje centered on skyline

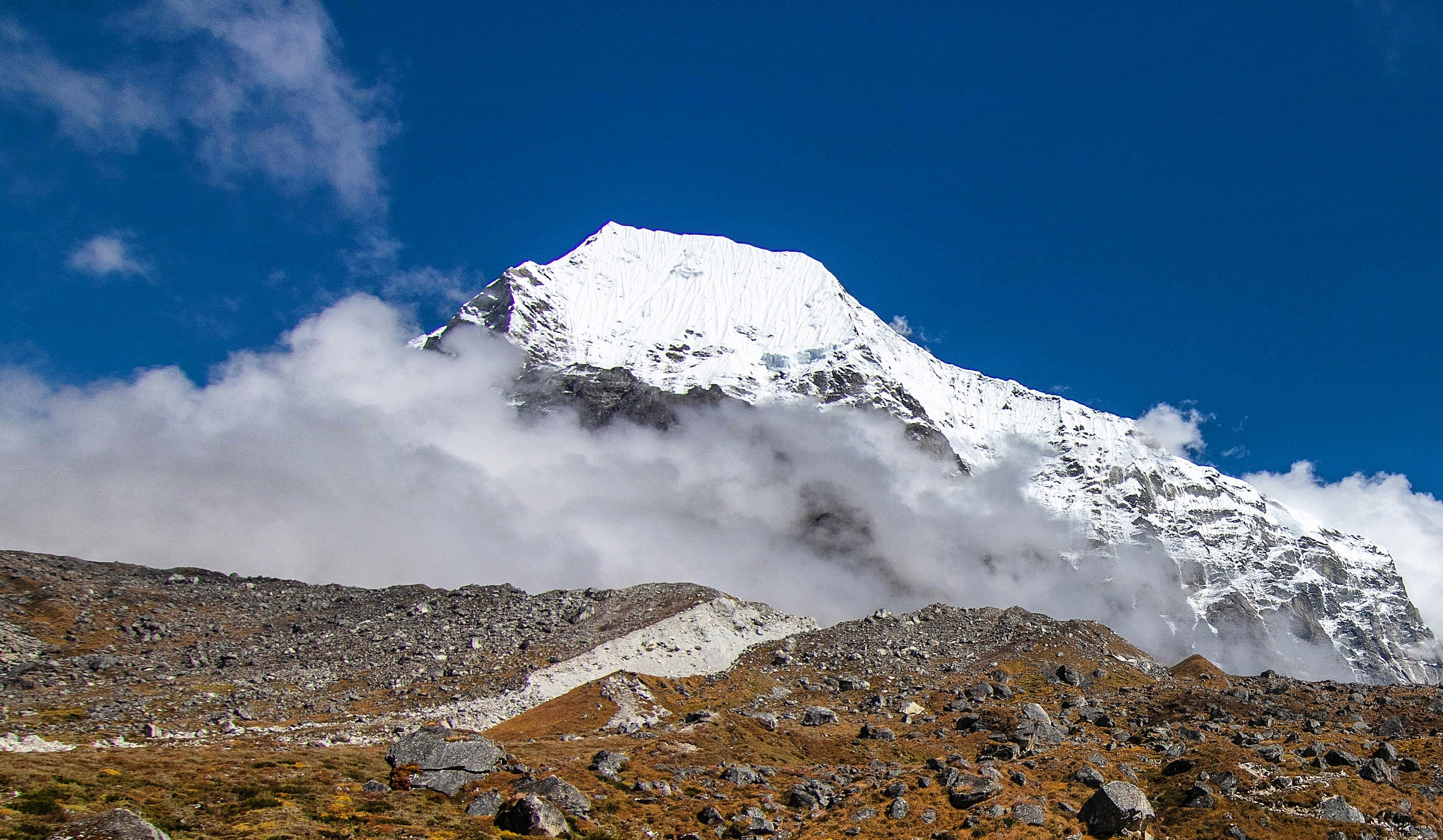

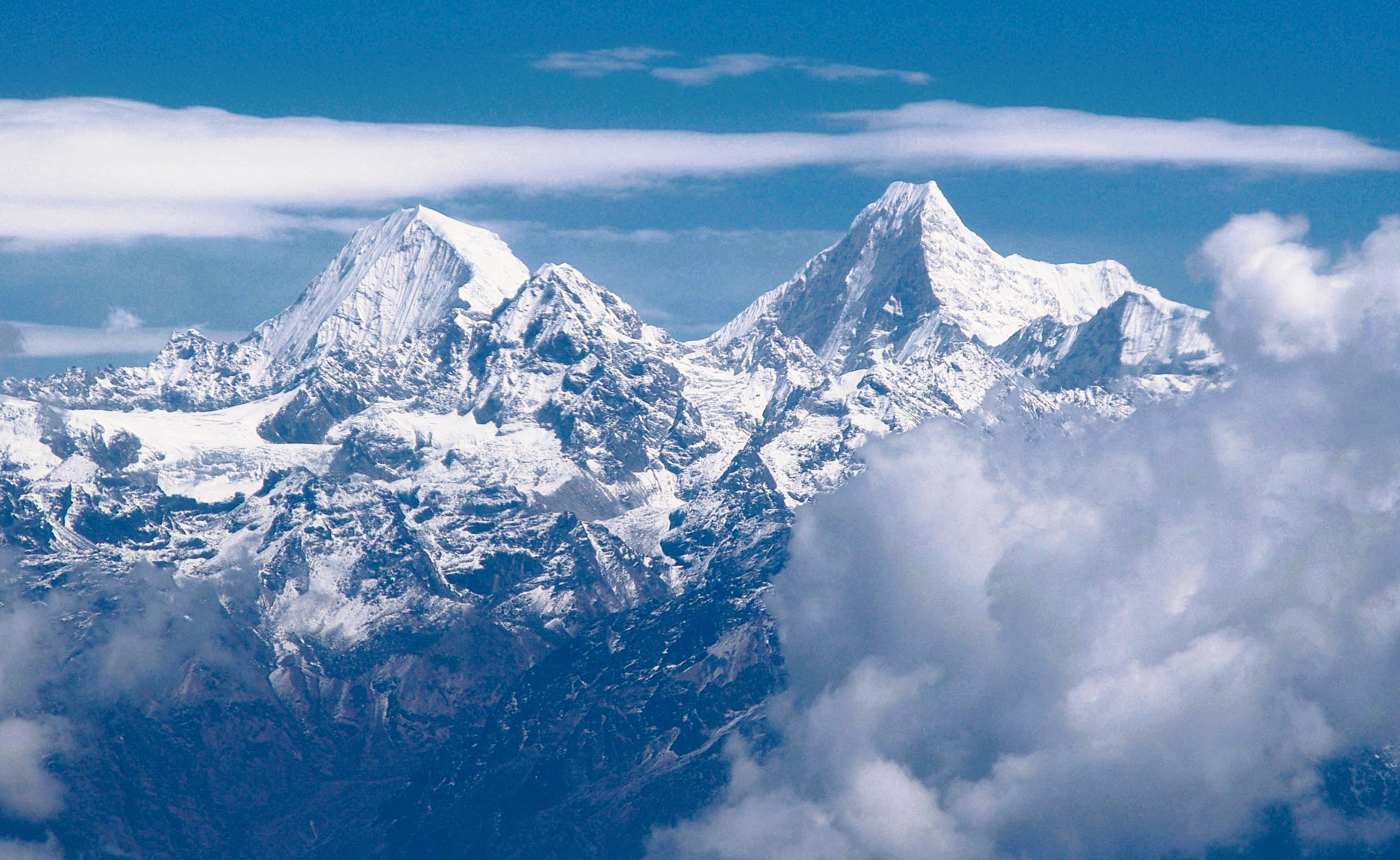
Tsoboje (left) and Takargo (right). Aerial view from south.

== See also ==
- Geology of the Himalayas
