= Tengi Ragi Tau =

Mountain in Nepal

- Agole
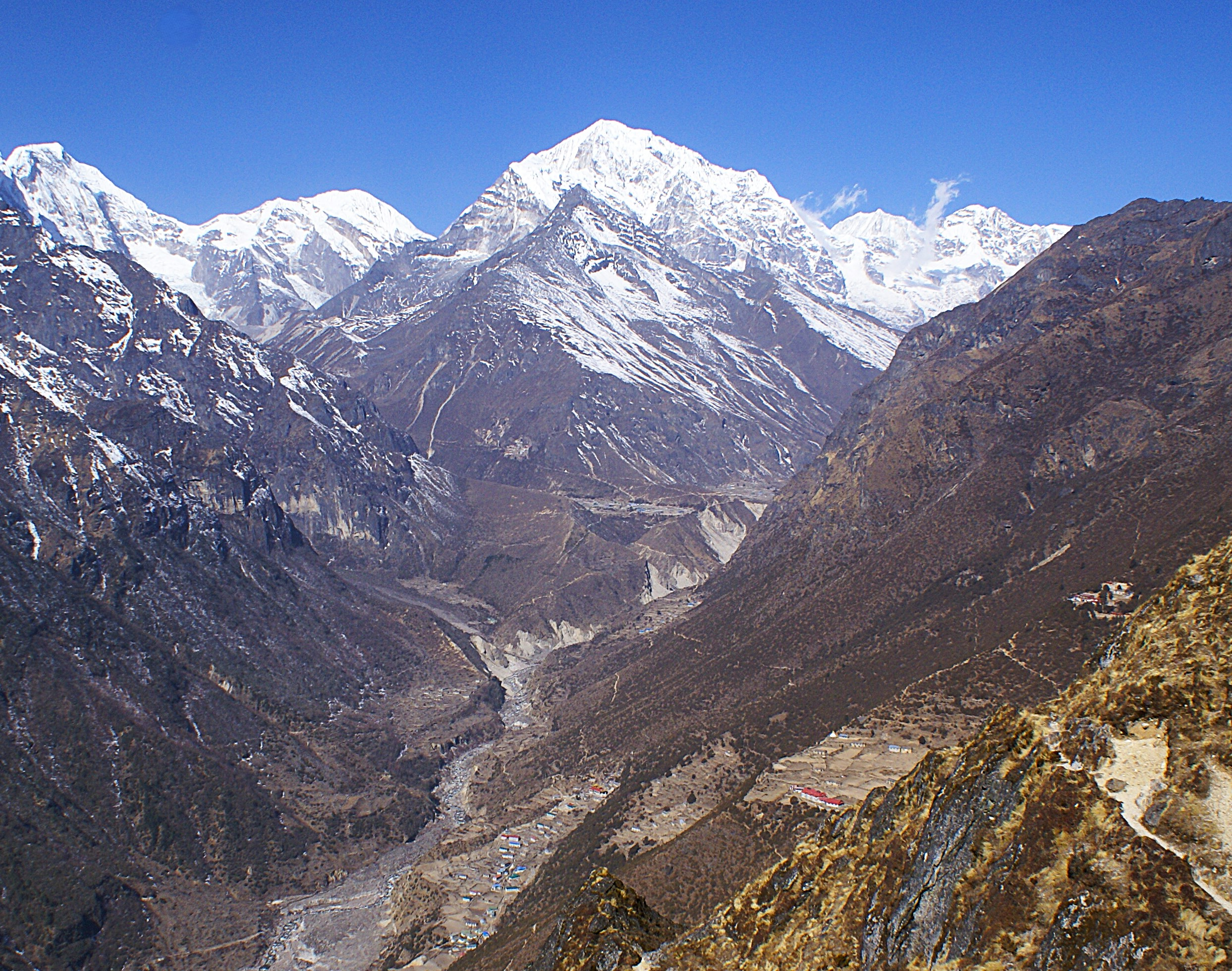
- East aspect

Highest point
- Elevation: 6,938 m (22,762 ft)
- Prominence: 1,218 m (3,996 ft)
- Parent peak: Numbur (6,958 m)
- Isolation: 11.63 km (7.23 mi)
- Coordinates: 27°51′26″N 86°33′15″E

Geography
- Location within Nepal
- Interactive map of Tengi Ragi Tau
- Country: Nepal
- Province: Bagmati / Koshi
- District: Dolakha / Solukhumbu
- Protected area: Sagarmatha National Park
- Parent range: Himalayas; Mahalangur Himal

Climbing
- First ascent: 2002

Tengi Ragi Tau, also known as Agole, is a mountain in Nepal.

== Description ==
Tengi Ragi Tau is a 6,938-metre (22,762-foot) summit on the western boundary of Sagarmatha National Park in the Nepalese Himalayas. It is set on the border shared by the Dolakha District and the Solukhumbu District. Precipitation runoff from the mountain's east slope drains to the Bhotekoshi River, whereas the west slope drains to the Tamakoshi River via Rolwāliṅ Khola. Topographic relief is significant as the summit rises 1,400 metres (4,593 ft) above the Drolambao Glacier in one kilometre (0.62 mi), and 2,560 metres (8,400 ft) above Dig Tsho Lake in three kilometres (1.9 mi). The first ascent of the summit was achieved on December 4, 2002, by Koichi Ezaki, Ruchia Takahashi, Pasang Tamang, and Tul Bahadur Tamang via the southeast face. The second ascent, first via the west face, was made on October 16, 2019, by Tino Villanueva and Alan Rousseau via a route they named Release the Kraken.

== Climate ==
Based on the Köppen climate classification, Tengi Ragi Tau is located in a tundra climate zone with cold, snowy winters, and cool summers. Weather systems coming off the Bay of Bengal are forced upwards by the Himalaya mountains (orographic lift), causing heavy precipitation in the form of rainfall and snowfall. Mid-June through early-August is the monsoon season. The months of April, May, September, October, and November offer the most favorable weather for viewing or climbing this peak.

== Gallery ==
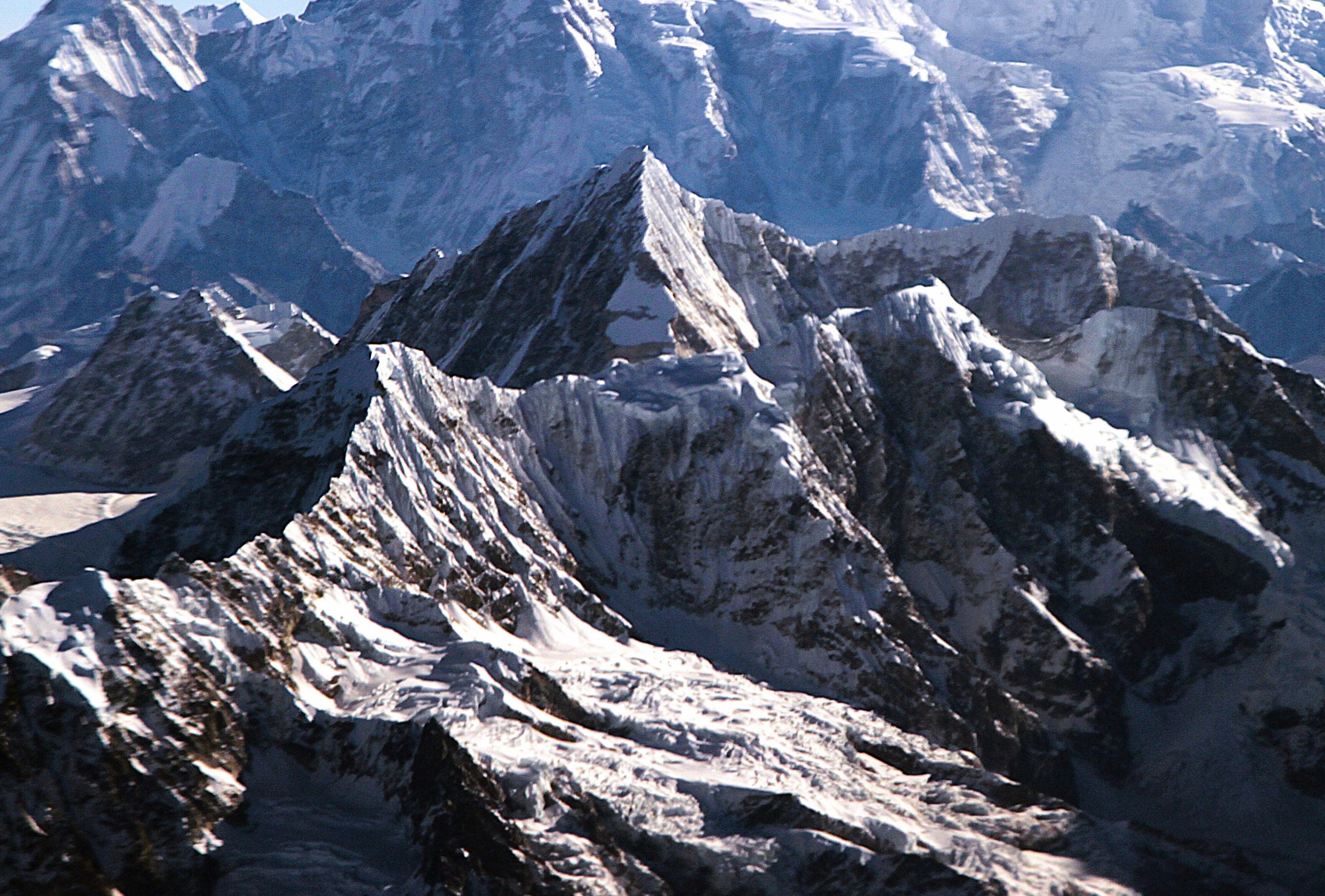
Aerial view of south aspect of Tengi Ragi Tau, centered.
(Double summit of Likhu Chuli in front)

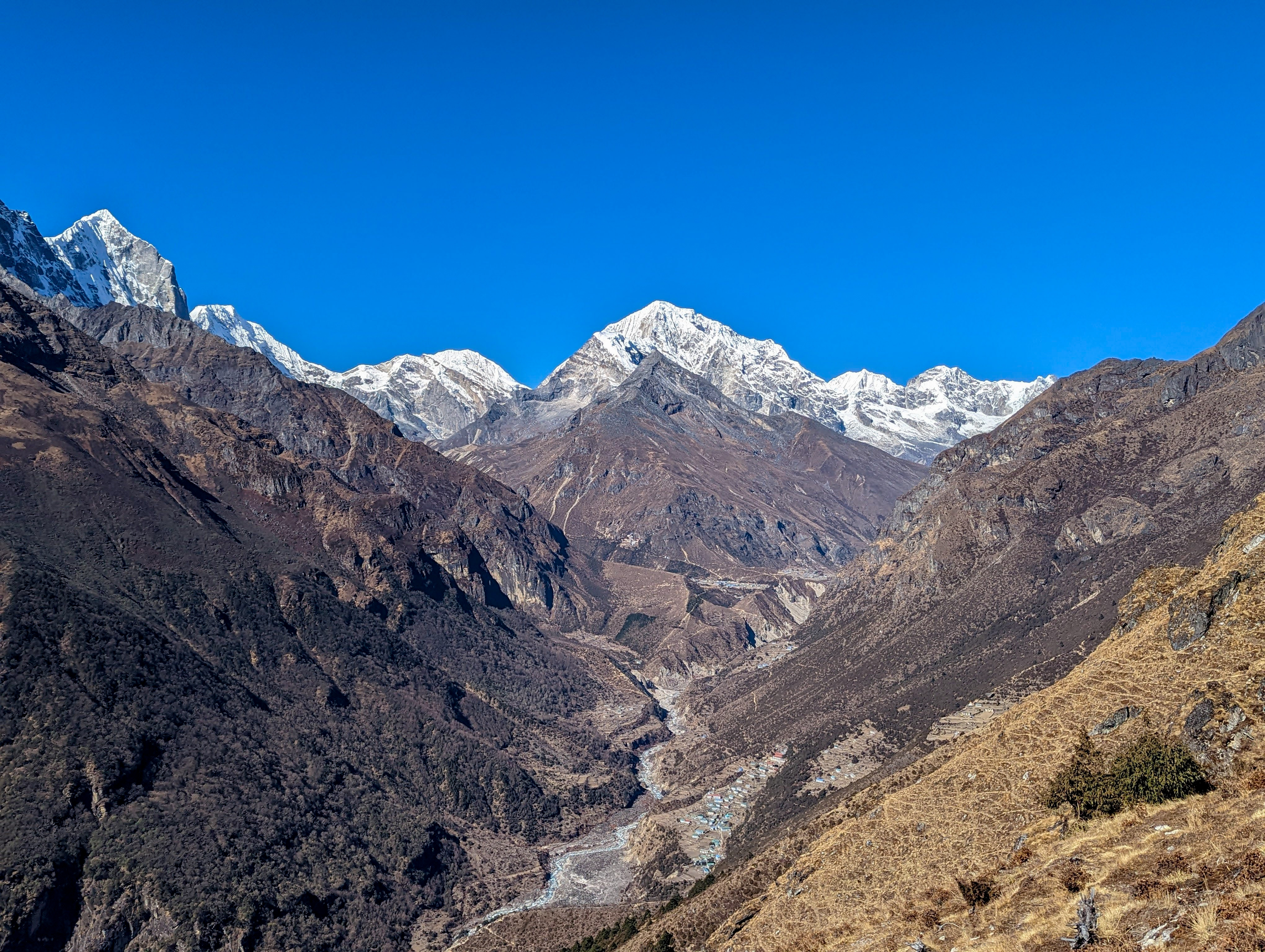
Tengi Ragi Tau centered

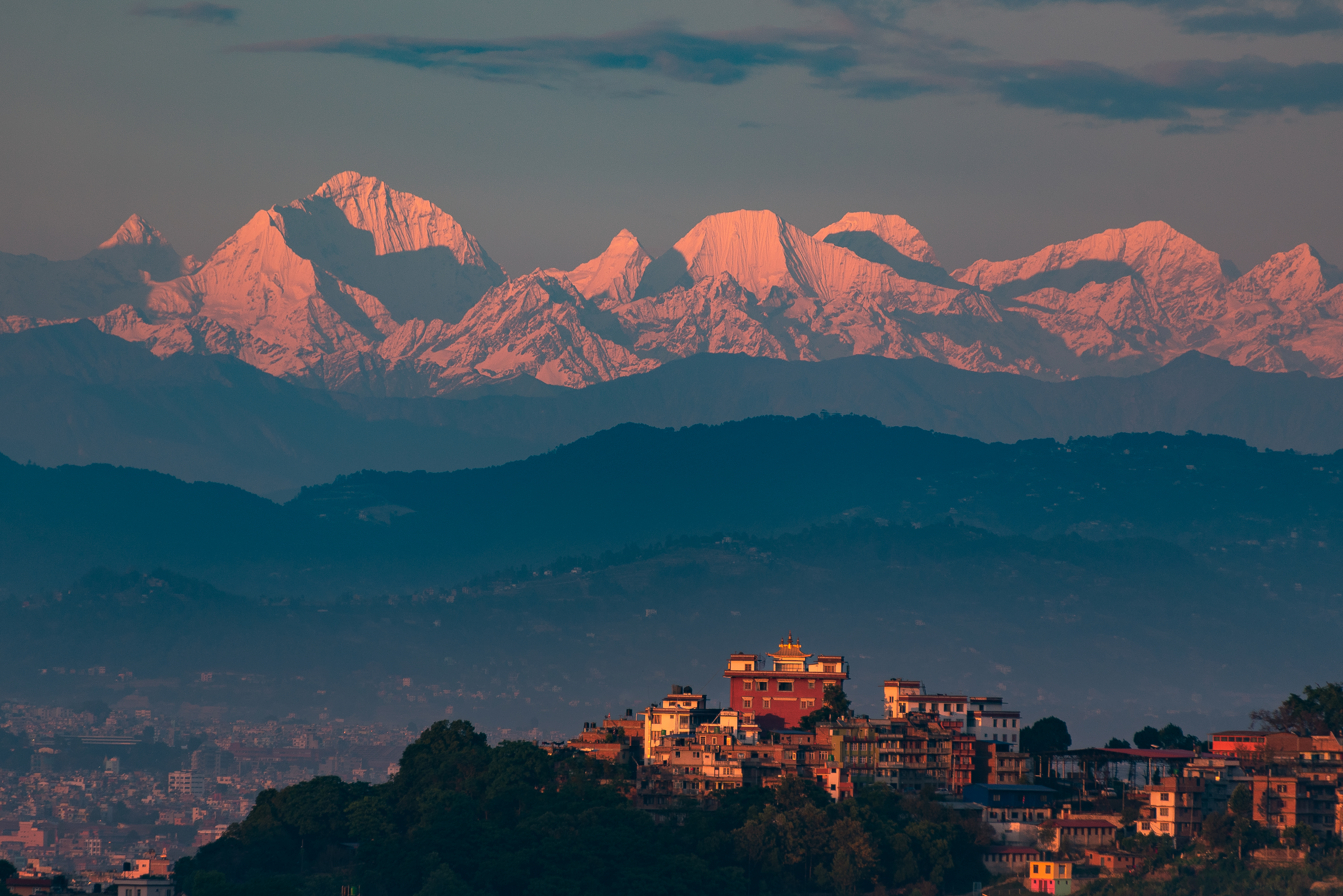
Tengi Ragi Tau on skyline to the right

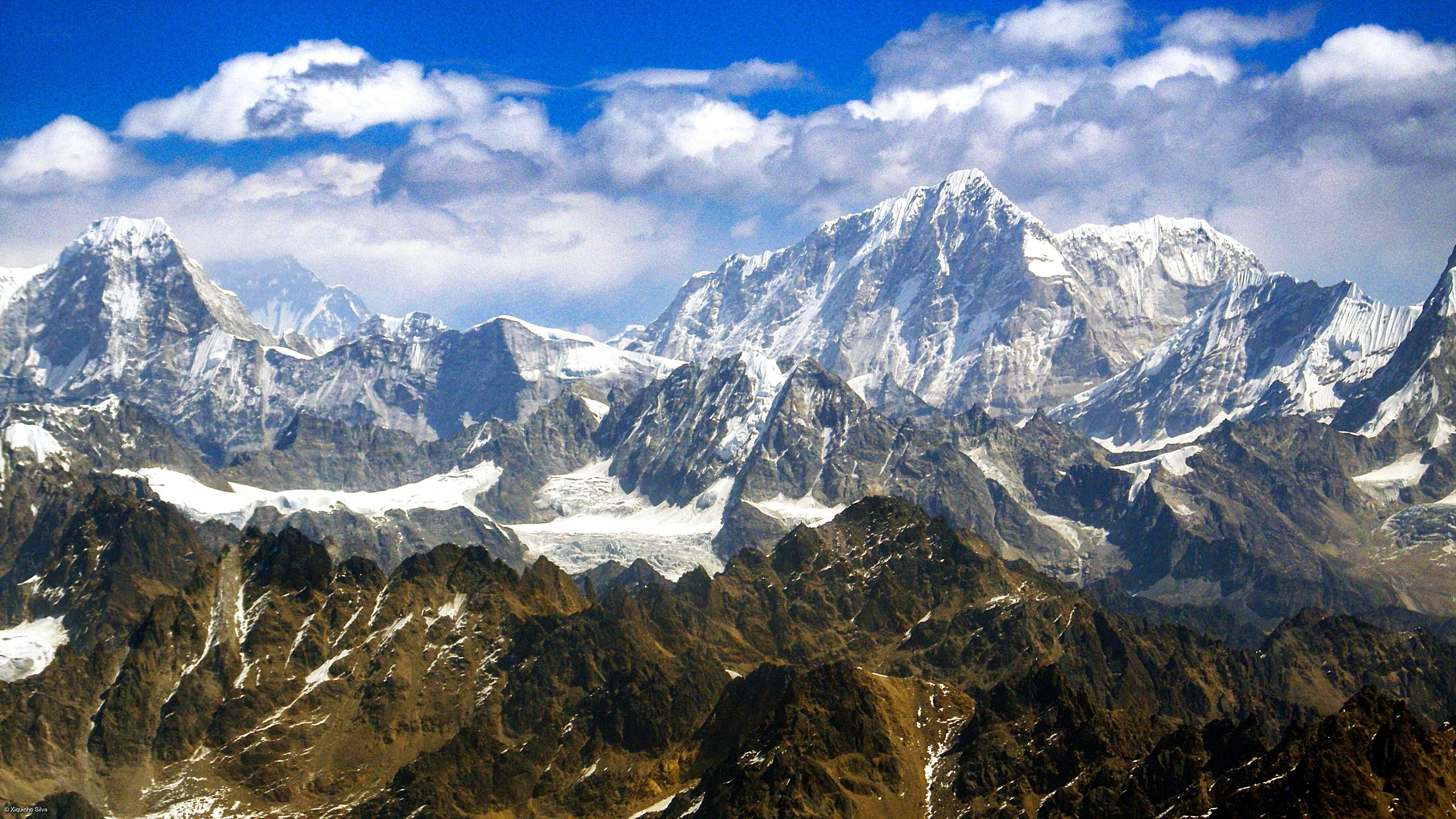
Aerial view of southwest aspect of Tengi Ragi Tau (right), with Takargo far left

== See also ==
- Geology of the Himalayas
