= Sacred Himalayan Landscape =

Large trans-boundary landscape in eastern Himalayas

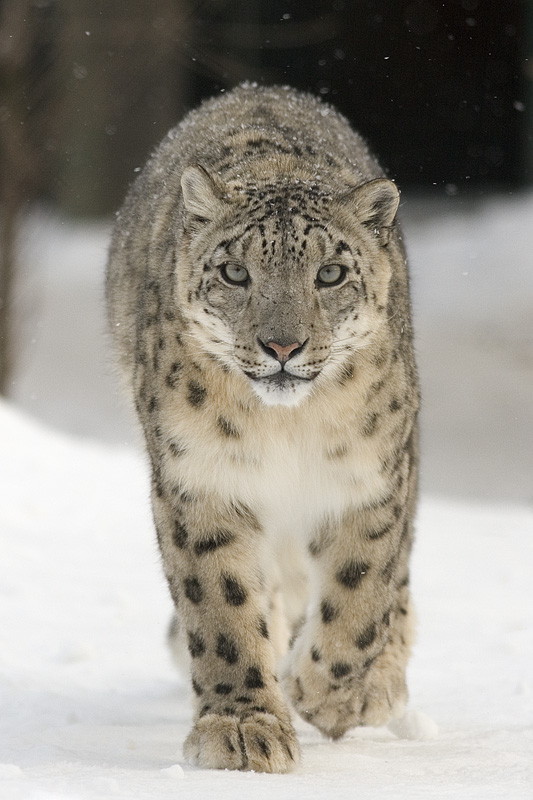
The endangered snow leopard is protected in the SHL.

The Sacred Himalayan Landscape is a 39,021 km^{2} (15,066 sq mi) large trans-boundary landscape in the eastern Himalayas encompassing temperate broadleaf and conifer forests, alpine meadows and grasslands, which harbour more than 80 mammal and more than 440 bird species. It extends from Nepal's Langtang National Park through Sikkim and Darjeeling in India to western Bhutan's Torsa Strict Nature Reserve. More than 73% of this landscape is located in Nepal, including Sagarmatha National Park, Makalu Barun National Park, and Kanchenjunga Conservation Area. About 24% is located in India, encompassing Khangchendzonga, Singalila and Neora Valley National Parks as well as Fambong Lho, Maenam, Senchal, Mahananda Wildlife Sanctuaries, Shingba and Barsey Rhododendron Sanctuaries and Kyongnosla Alpine Sanctuary.

It links the Qomolangma National Nature Preserve in Tibet, one of the largest protected areas in Asia, with the Kangchenjunga Landscape in India and the Bhutan Biological Conservation Complex in Bhutan.

Climate change threatens the flora and fauna of this area. Trans-boundary protection of its biological and ecological connections is critical for the survival of such species as the snow leopard and the red panda that are threatened throughout the world.

== Sustainable livelihoods for the people ==
The area covers nine and a half million acres and includes five million people of diverse cultures who speak 40 languages. Most face abject poverty and are in need of sustainable livelihoods.

SHL is part of an initiative of the World Wildlife Federation (WWF) that "taps into the spiritual beliefs and conservation ethics of local communities to restore essential habitats and protect endangered species such as the snow leopard."

WWF has cooperated with the three governments of Nepal, India and Bhutan to preserve the fragile "complex mosaic of biodiversity" and "achieve conservation while creating sustainable livelihoods in the Sacred Himalayan Landscape". The mountains in the SHL contain the future water supply, in the form of glaciers, for the huge population on the Indian subcontinent but are susceptible to natural disasters such as landslides, forest fires and flash floods that are caused by poor land management.

The Mountain Institute (TMI) has worked with farmers in the SHL by teaching them to cultivate medical plants, having trained over 12,500 since 2001.
