= Tsho Rolpa =

- Cho Rolpa
- Location within Nepal
- Interactive map of Tsho Rolpa
- Location: Rolwaling Valley, Dolakha District, Nepal
- Coordinates: 27°52′N 86°28′E
- Type: glacial lake
- Primary inflows: Trakarding glacier
- Primary outflows: Rolwaling and Tamakoshi rivers
- Max. length: 3.45 kilometres (2.14 mi)
- Max. width: 0.5 kilometres (0.31 mi)
- Surface area: 1.537 square kilometres (0.593 mi^{2})
- Average depth: 55 metres (180 ft)
- Max. depth: 135 metres (443 ft)
- Water volume: 85,940,000 cubic metres (3.035×10^{9} cu ft)
- Surface elevation: 4,580 metres (15,030 ft)

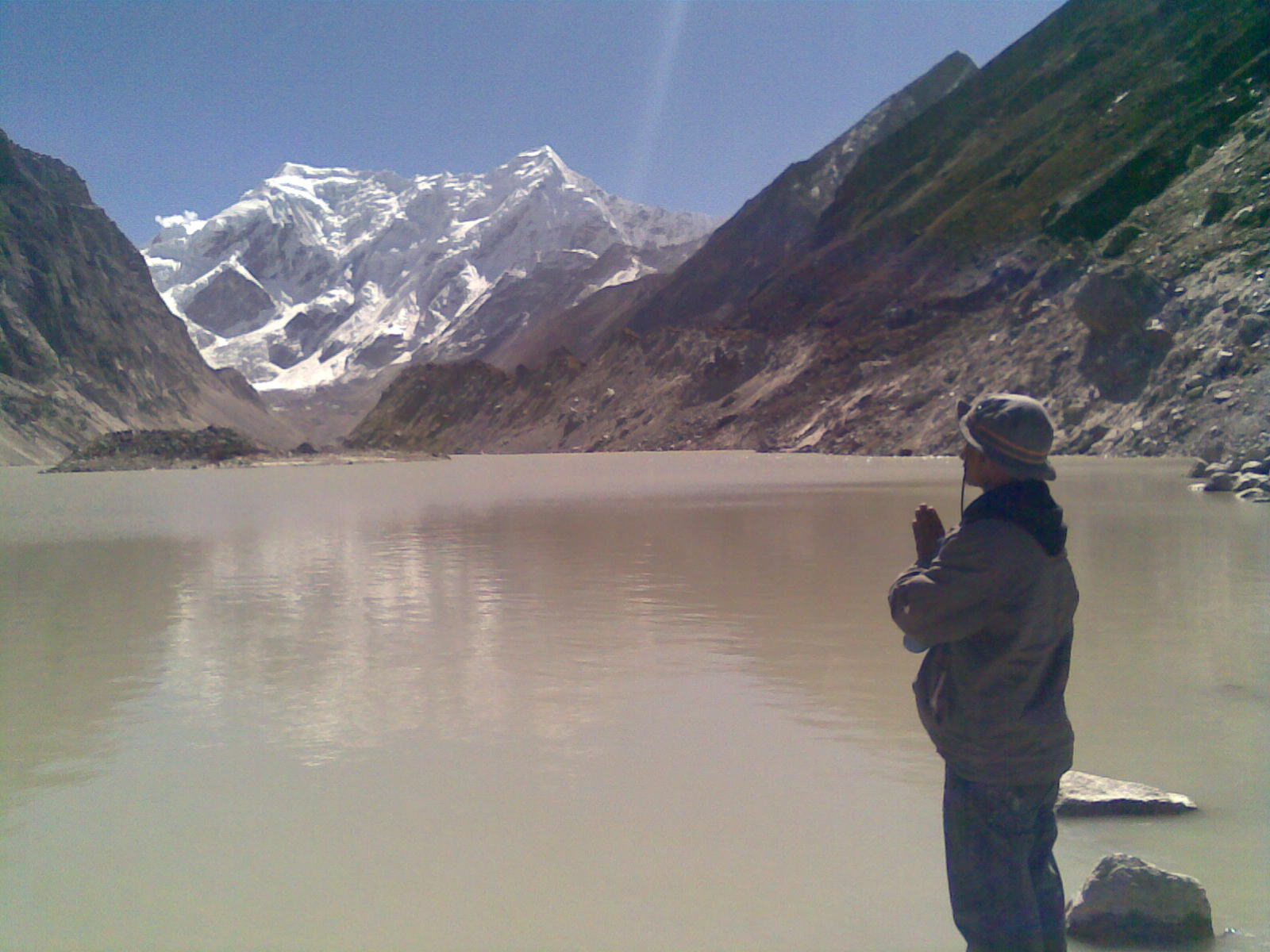
Tsho Rolpa glacier lake in 2007

Tsho Rolpa (also Cho Rolpa) is one of the biggest glacial lakes in Nepal. The lake, which is located at an altitude of 4,580 metres (15,030 ft) in the Rolwaling Valley, Dolakha District, has grown considerably over the last 50 years due to glacial melting in the Himalayas.

Tsho Rolpa (also Cho Rolpa)

== Flooding ==
The lake threatens to burst through its unstable dam, which would threaten the lives and livestock of over 6100 villagers living around the Tamakoshi River. In 2012, the UNDP reported that an early warning system installed by the authorities in the late 1990s, which became defunct through lack of maintenance, will be replaced by a more modern warning system for glacial floods from the lake.
