= Department of National Parks and Wildlife Conservation =

Nepalese government agency

- राष्ट्रिय निकुञ्ज तथा वन्यजन्तु संरक्षण विभाग
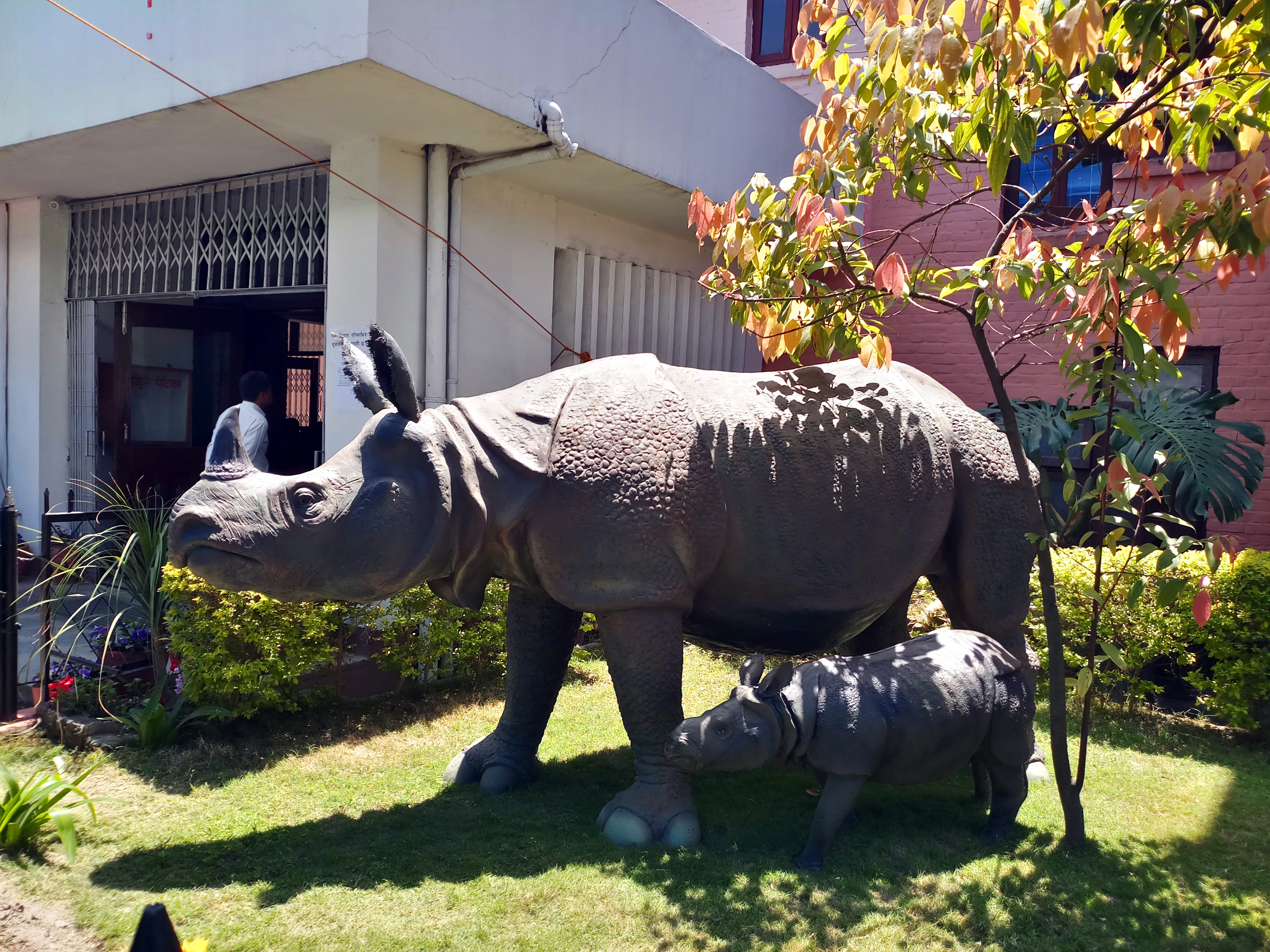

Agency overview
- Formed: 1980
- Jurisdiction: Nepal
- Headquarters: Babar Mahal, Kathmandu, Nepal
- Annual budget: NPR 215,155,000
- Minister responsible: Sushila Karki, Prime Minister of Nepal
- Agency executive: Dr. Budhi Sagar Paudel, Director General
- Parent agency: Ministry of Forests and Environment, Government of Nepal
- Website: https://dnpwc.gov.np/en/

The Department of National Parks and Wildlife Conservation (Nepali: राष्ट्रिय निकुञ्ज तथा वन्यजन्तु संरक्षण विभाग, romanized: Rāṣṭriya Nikuñja Tathā Van'yajantu Sanrakṣaṇa Vibhāga) is a government agency of Nepal and one of five departments of the Ministry of Forests and Soil Conservation. It is assigned with the responsibilities of conserving the wildlife of Nepal. It is furthermore responsible for managing the protected areas of Nepal, including national parks and conservation areas. The department is also part of the REDD+ Group.

== Duties ==
Additional to conserving flora and fauna in Nepal and managing national parks, the Department of National Parks and Wild Life Conservation also supports people living within the boundaries of those parks as well as their buffer zones and promotes ecotourism. The department also carries out surveys including annual censuses of endangered species, such as the Bengal tiger. Furthermore, the department creates revenue from film shooting in national parks and conservation areas.

== Gallery ==
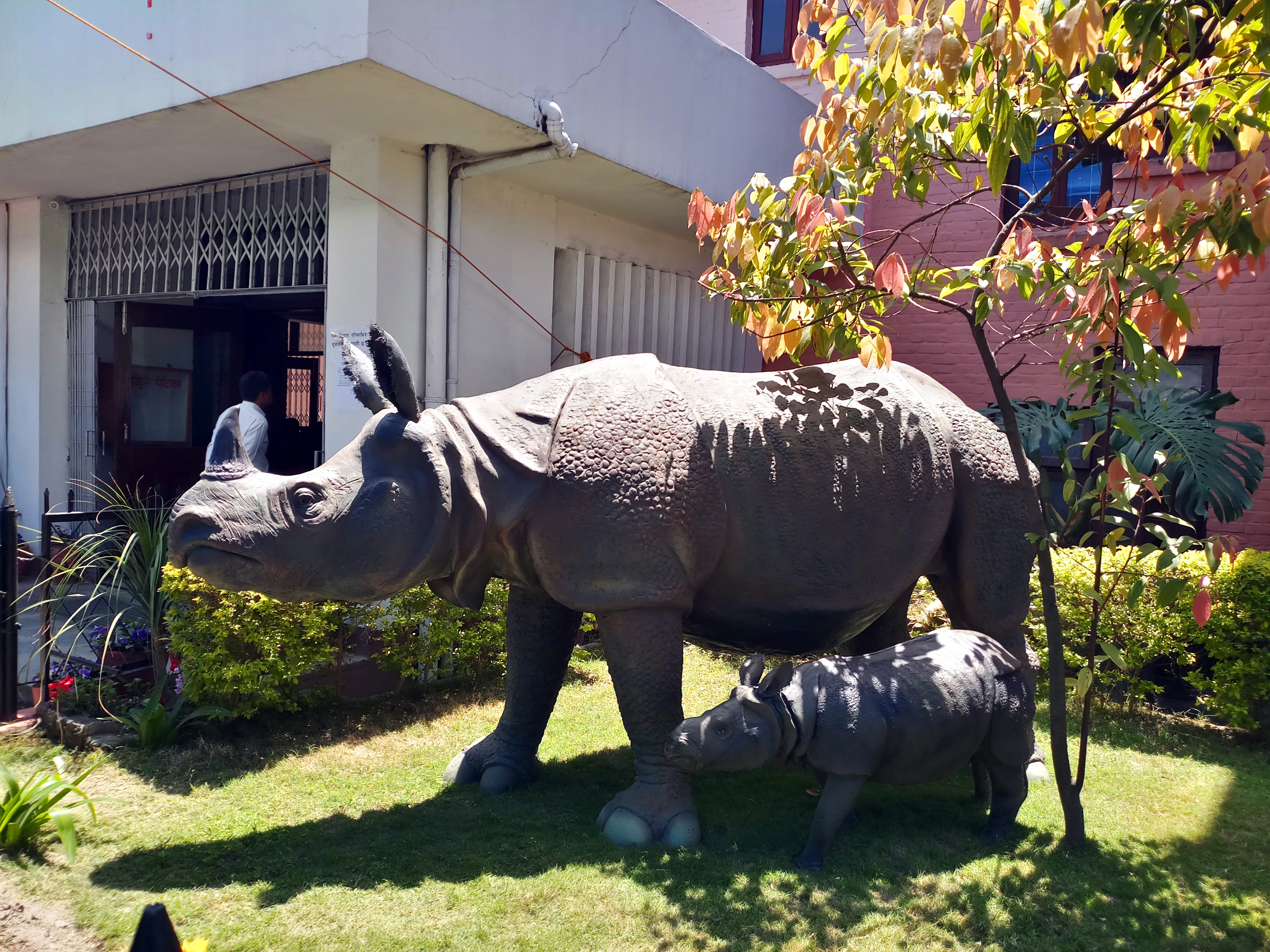
Department of National Parks and Wildlife Conservation, Babar Mahal, Kathmandu, Nepal

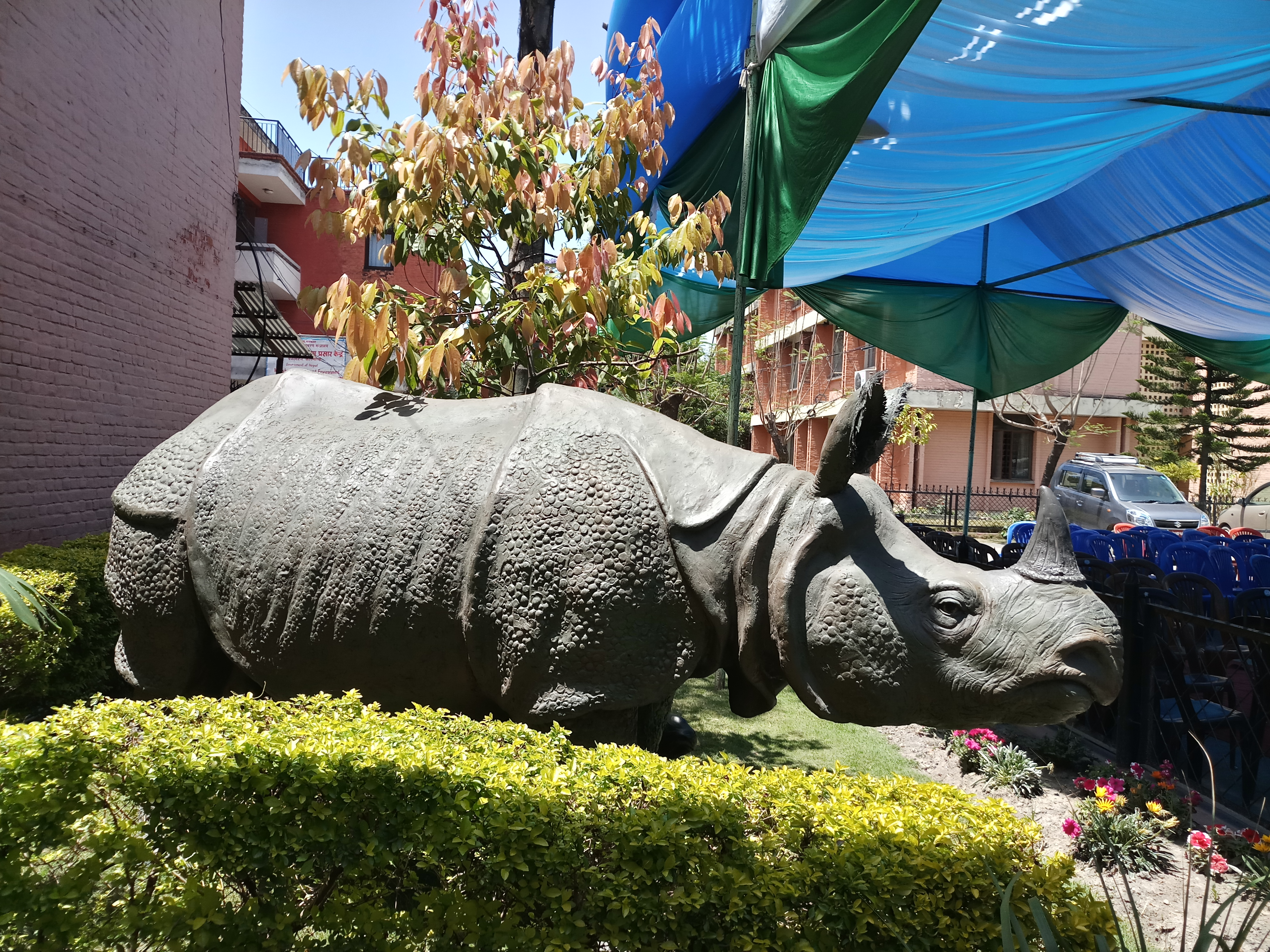
Department of National Parks and Wildlife Conservation, Babar Mahal, Kathmandu, Nepal1

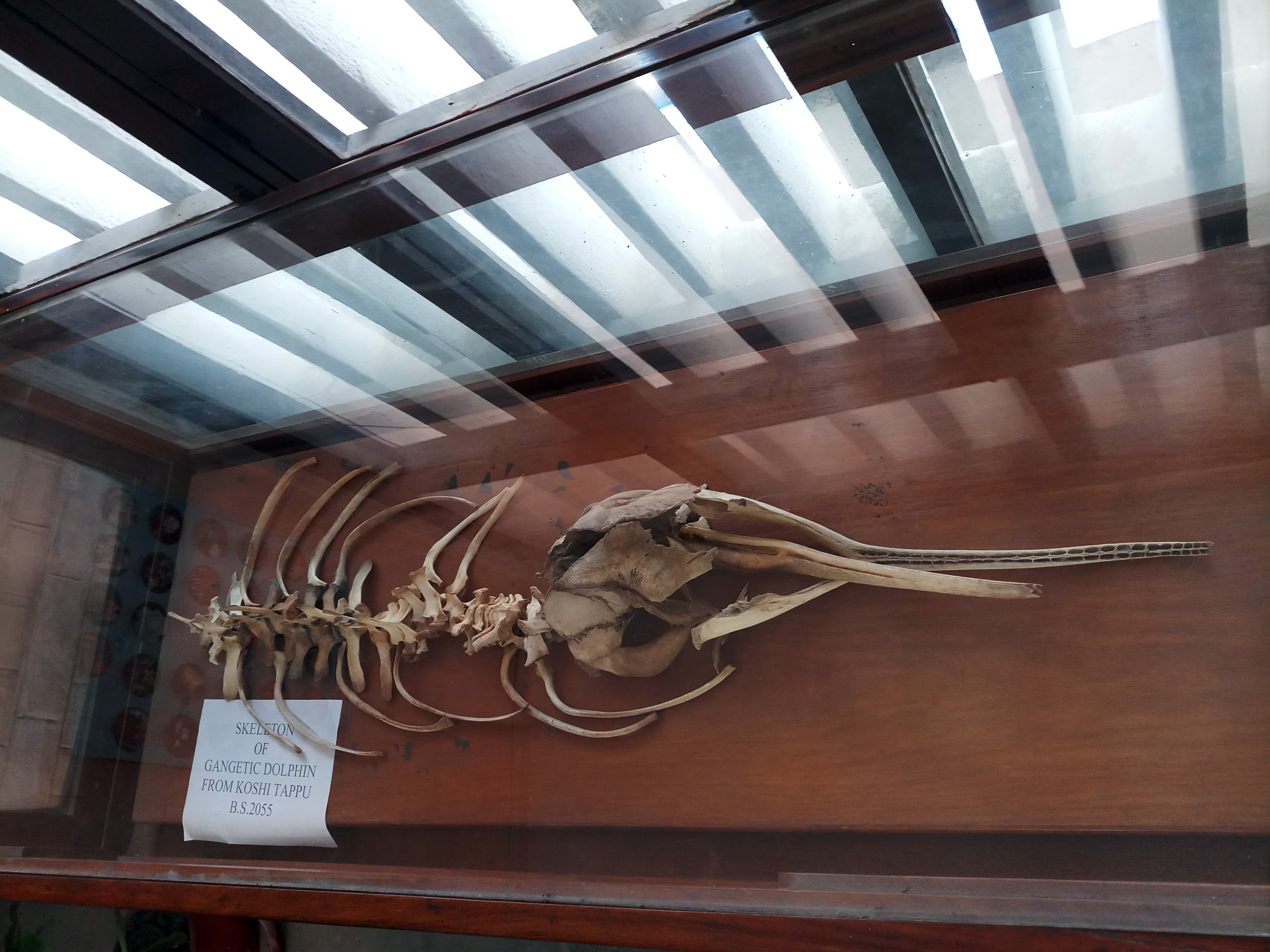
Skeleton of Gangetic Dolphin, Department of National Parks and Wildlife Conservation, Babar Mahal, Kathmandu, Nepal
