= Sagarmatha National Park =

National Park of Nepal

- Nepali: सगरमाथा राष्ट्रिय निकुञ्ज
- IUCN category II (national park)
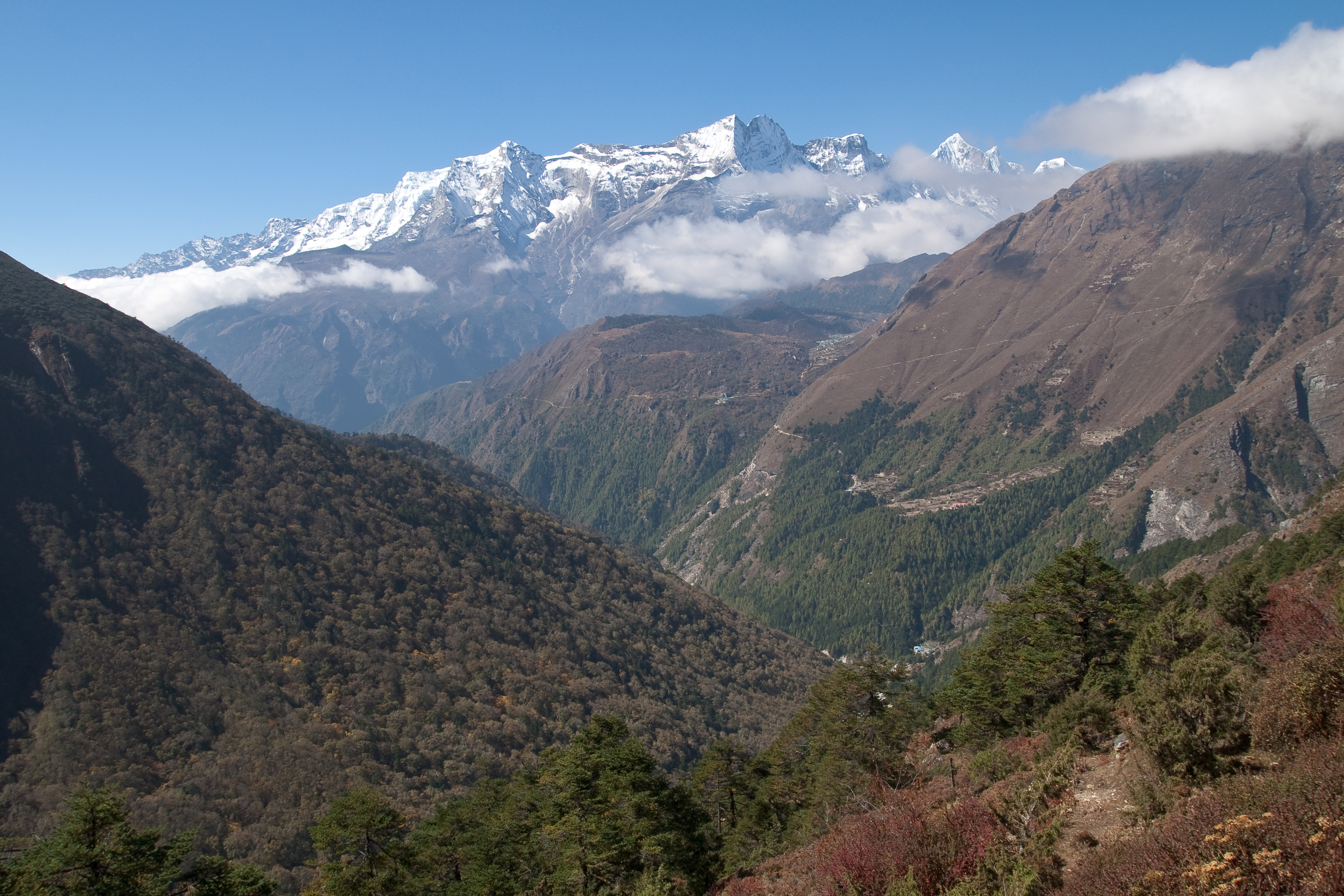
- Landscape in the national park

- Location within Koshi Province Location within Nepal Location within Tibet
- Interactive map of Sagarmatha National Park
- Location: Koshi, Nepal
- Nearest city: Namche, Khumjung
- Coordinates: 27°56′N 86°44′E
- Area: 1,148 km^{2} (443 sq mi)
- Max. elevation: Mount Everest
- Established: 19 July 1976
- Governing body: Department of National Parks and Wildlife Conservation
- Website: sagarmathanationalpark.gov.np

UNESCO World Heritage Site
- Criteria: Natural: vii
- Reference: 120
- Inscription: 1979 (3rd Session)

Sagarmāthā National Park is a national park in the Himalayas of eastern Nepal that was established in 1976 and encompasses an area of 1,148 km^{2} (443 sq mi) in the Solukhumbu District. It ranges in elevation from 2,845 to 8,848 m (9,334 to 29,029 ft) and includes Mount Everest. In the north, it borders Qomolangma National Nature Preserve, and Makalu Barun National Park in the east; in the south, it extends to Dudh Kosi river. It is part of the Sacred Himalayan Landscape.

== History ==
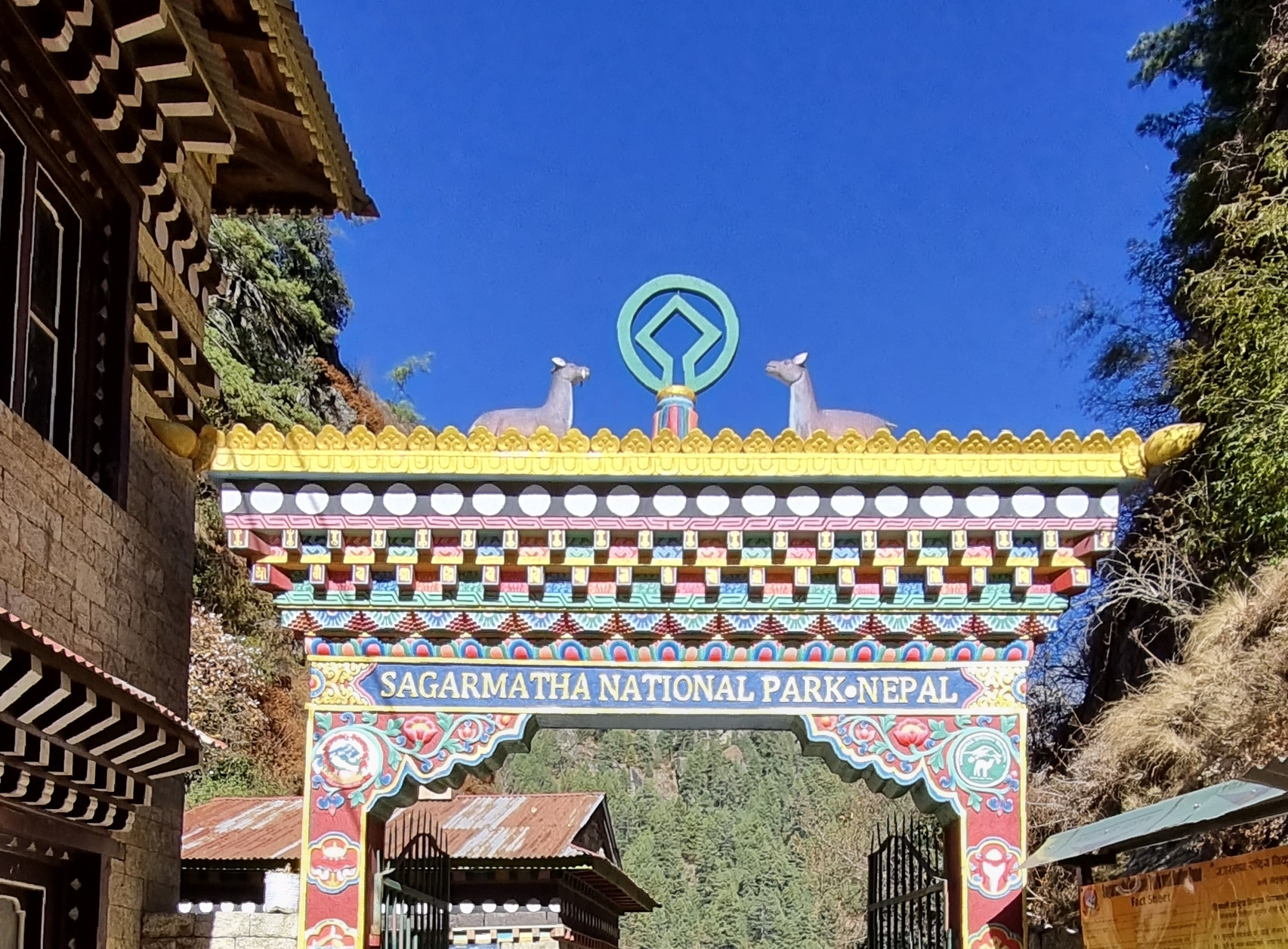
Entrance gate of the Sagarmatha National Park

Sagarmatha National Park is a National Park northeastern of Nepal, and was established on 19 July 1976. In 1979, it became the country's first national park that was inscribed as a Natural World Heritage Site. In January 2002, a Buffer Zone comprising 275 km^{2} (106 sq mi) was added. Conservation of forests, wildlife, and cultural resources received top priority under the Buffer Zone Management Guidelines, followed by conservation of other natural resources and development of alternative energy. Tourism in the area began in the early 1960s. In 2003, about 19,000 tourists arrived. As of 2005, about 3,500 Sherpa people lived in villages and seasonal settlements situated along the main tourist trails.

== Landscape ==
Sagarmatha National Park contains the upper catchment areas of the Dudh Kosi and Bhotekoshi rivers and the Gokyo Lakes. It ranges in elevation from 2,845 m (9,334 ft) at Monjo to the top of Mount Everest at 8,848 m (29,029 ft). Other peaks above 6,000 m (20,000 ft) are Lhotse, Cho Oyu, Thamserku, Nuptse, Amadablam and Pumori. Barren land above 5,000 m (16,000 ft) comprises 69% of the park while 28% is grazing land and the remaining 3% is forested. Climatic zones span from temperate and subalpine above 3,000 m (9,800 ft) to alpine above 4,000 m (13,000 ft), which is the upper limit of vegetation growth. The nival zone begins at 5,000 m (16,000 ft).

== Wildlife ==
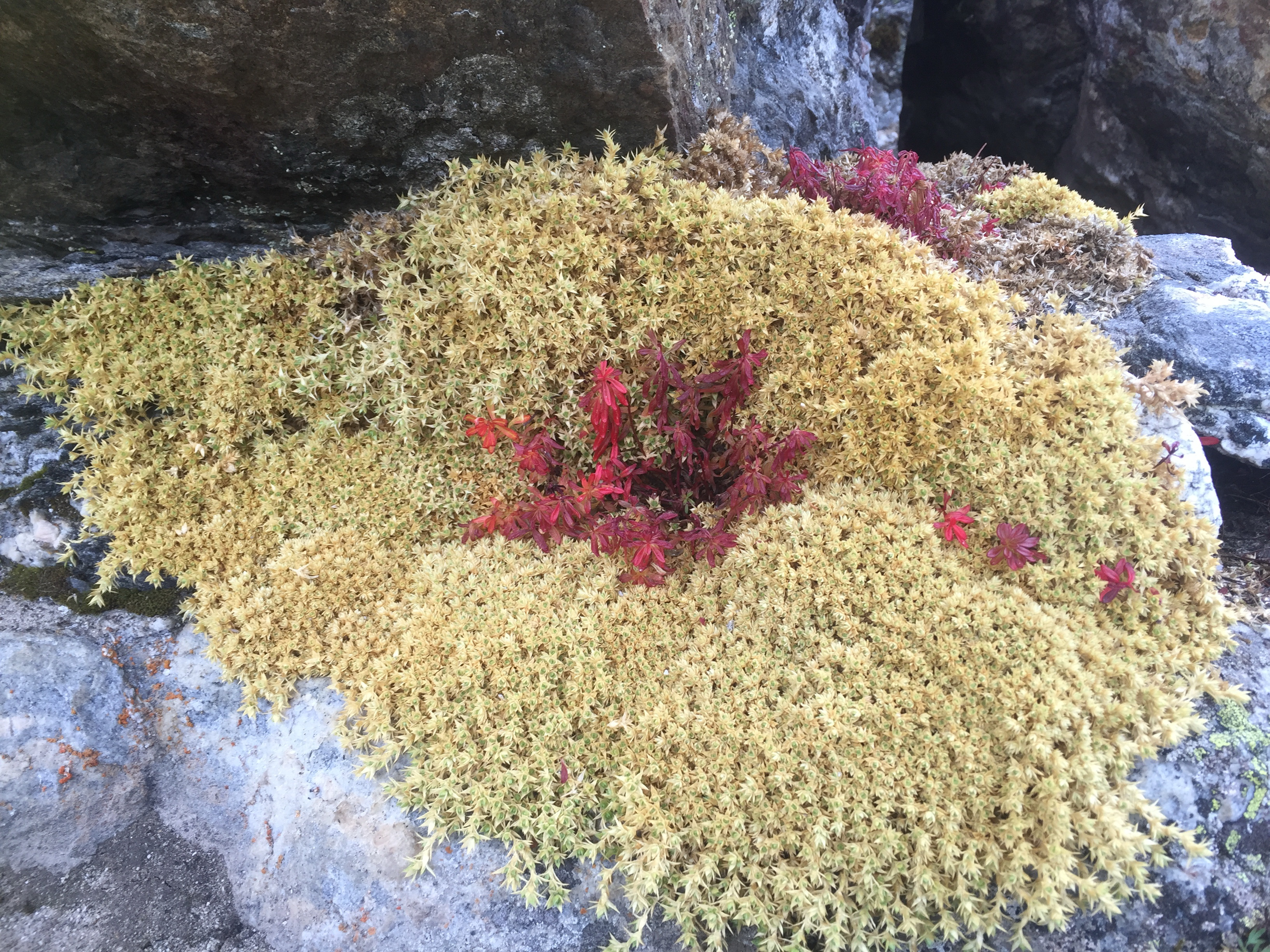
Flowers at an elevation of 5,000 m (16,000 ft)

=== Flora ===
The forests in the subalpine belt consist of fir, Himalayan birch and rhododendron. Juniper and rhododendron prevail at elevations of 4,000–5,000 m (13,000–16,000 ft). Mosses and lichens grow above 5,000 m (16,000 ft). More than 1,000 floral species were recorded in the national park.

=== Fauna ===
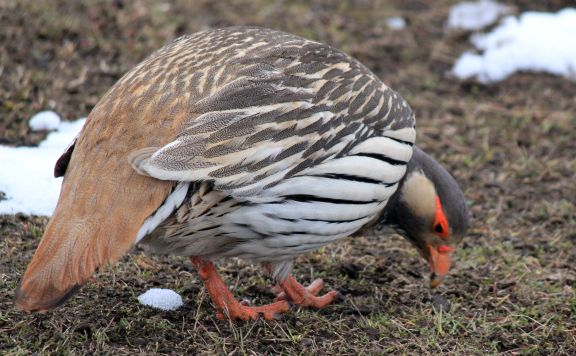
Snowcock in the national park

Sagarmatha National Park hosts 208 bird species including Impeyan pheasant, bearded vulture, snowcock and alpine chough. It has been designated as an Important Bird Area. Ungulates include Himalayan tahr, Himalayan serow and musk deer. The snow leopard inhabits elevations above 3,500 m (11,500 ft), and the Indian leopard roams forests in lower elevations.
