= Malcolm Slesser =

Charles George Malcolm Slesser (30 October 1926 – 26 June 2007) was a Scottish energy analyst, scientist, author and mountaineer.

== Biography ==
Born in Aberdeen, Slesser graduated with a PhD in Chemical engineering from the University of Edinburgh. He began mountain climbing when he was young. Between July 1952 and August 1954 Slesser joined the British North Greenland Expedition in the Arctic, for which he was awarded the Polar Medal. He wrote widely on mountain climbing and was considered to be an expert in the field.

Slesser worked in a number of industries in the private sector before settling in academia, including the synthetic fibers, oil and nuclear industries. He became a professor of Energy at the University of Strathclyde. The author of more than 100 published technical papers, Slesser's books ranged from energy systems and the environment to exploration and sustainable development.

Slesser pioneered the study of the potential for economic growth that led to methods for estimating the economic carrying capacity through the ECCO (Evaluation of Capital Creation Options also referred to as the Enhancement of Carrying Capacity or Economic Coordination Options) model of an economy uses the stocks-and-flows paradigm (aka system dynamics) to track energy and other natural capital flows through the economy. ECCO models were first developed by Malcolm Slesser in Edinburgh in the late 1990s along with Jay Baguant, Dr Anupam Saraph, Dr Wouter Biesiot, Dr Klass Jan Noorman and Jane King.

The Pamirs expedition of 1962 was a difficult affair. Both the Alpine Club and the Scottish Mountaineering Club had been asking to climb in the Pamir Mountains of Central Asia, which were then part of the Soviet Union. Then John Hunt (of the Alpine Club) and Slesser (of the SMC) received telegrams from the Soviets granting permission for a party of 12 British climbers to mount an expedition to the Pamirs, provided the two joined forces. Slesser said of this: "It was a bit like proposing that North and South Korea should co-operate on making a nuclear bomb." In the event, Slesser and Hunt were joint leaders of the British party, which mounted a joint expedition with the Soviets with the goal of climbing Ismoil Somoni Peak. The animosity between the Scots and the English was exceeded by that between the British and the Soviets. Early on, two of the climbers – Robin Smith and Wilfrid Noyce – were killed, and Hunt went home. Slessor's best known book, Red Peak, chronicled the expedition.

Slesser died while walking on the Ardnish Peninsula at Loch Ailort in the Scottish Highlands. It is suspected he suffered a heart attack. His family erected a cairn on the spot he died. (latitude 56°51.899’ N; longitude 05°46.195’W).

== Selected publications ==
- Red Peak: A Personal Account of the British Soviet Expedition 1962 (London: Hodder & Stoughton, 1964, 256 pp, with endpaper maps, 12pp b/w & 4pp of colour plates)
- Scottish Mountains on Ski (1970)
- The Island of Skye (1975)
- With Friends in High Places (2004)
