= Kongma Tse =

Mountain in Nepal

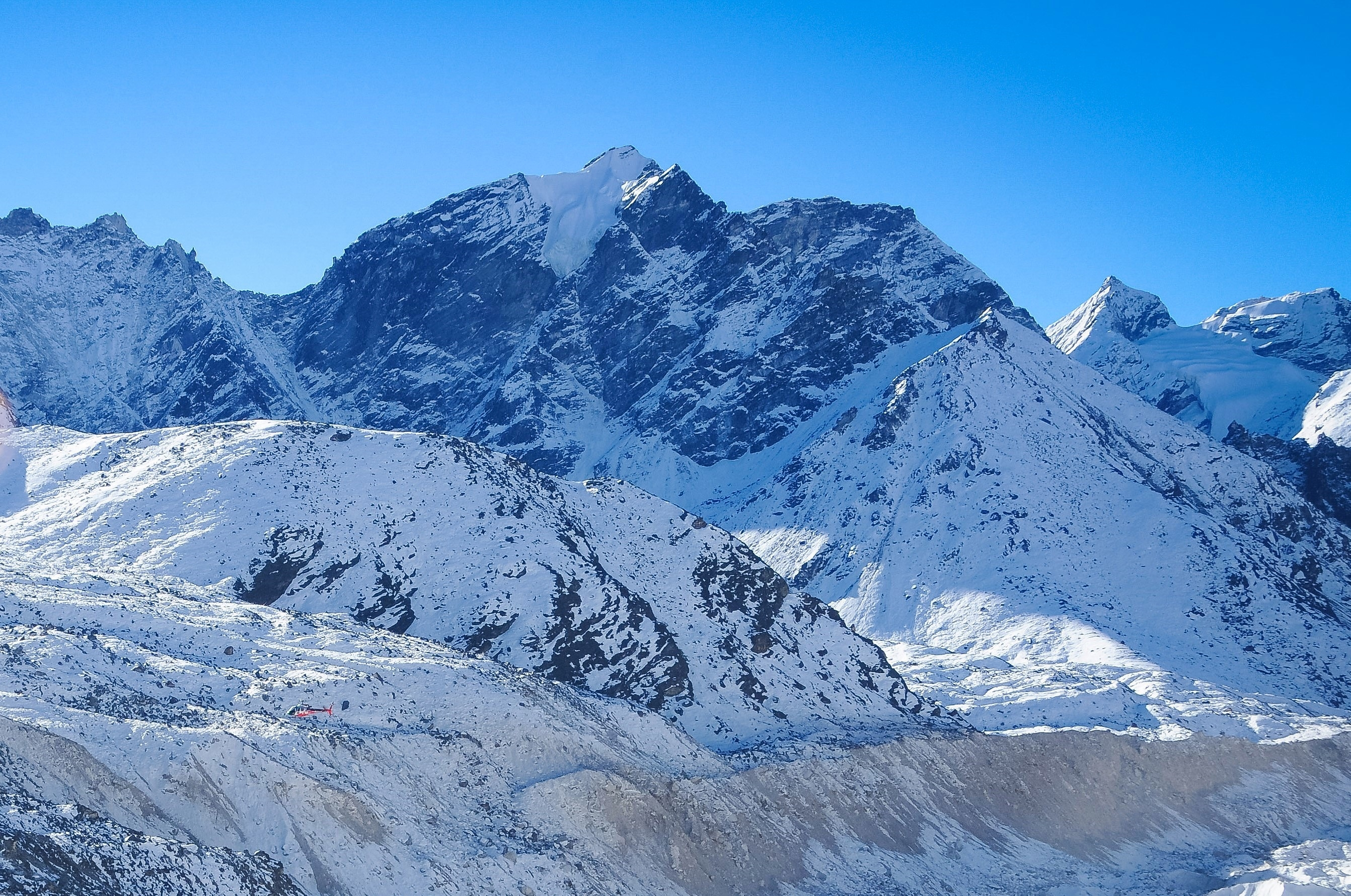
- North aspect

Highest point
- Elevation: 5,849 m (19,190 ft)
- Prominence: 33 m (108 ft)
- Parent peak: Nuptse
- Isolation: 2.25 km (1.40 mi)
- Listing: Mountains of Nepal
- Coordinates: 27°56′38″N 86°50′18″E

Geography
- Location within Nepal
- Interactive map of Kongma Tse
- Location: Khumbu
- Country: Nepal
- Province: Koshi
- District: Solukhumbu
- Protected area: Sagarmatha National Park
- Parent range: Himalayas; Mahalangur Himal

Kongma Tse (Nepali: कोङ्मा त्से) is a mountain in the Koshi Province, Nepal. Kongma Tse is part of the Mahalangur Himal and it has an elevation of 5,849 metres (19,190 ft).

It was formerly called Mehra Peak, but, it was later renamed Kongma Tse to avoid confusion with Mera Peak. "Kongma Tse" means Snowcock, a bird native to Nepal.

Kongma Tse is situated above the Khumbu Glacier opposite Lobuche. Kongma Tse is twined with Pokalde.

== Climate ==
Based on the Köppen climate classification, Kongma Tse is located in a tundra climate zone with cold, snowy winters, and cool summers. Weather systems coming off the Bay of Bengal are forced upwards by the Himalaya mountains (orographic lift), causing heavy precipitation in the form of rainfall and snowfall. Mid-June through early-August is the monsoon season. The months of April, May, September, and October offer the most favorable weather for viewing or climbing this peak.

== Gallery ==
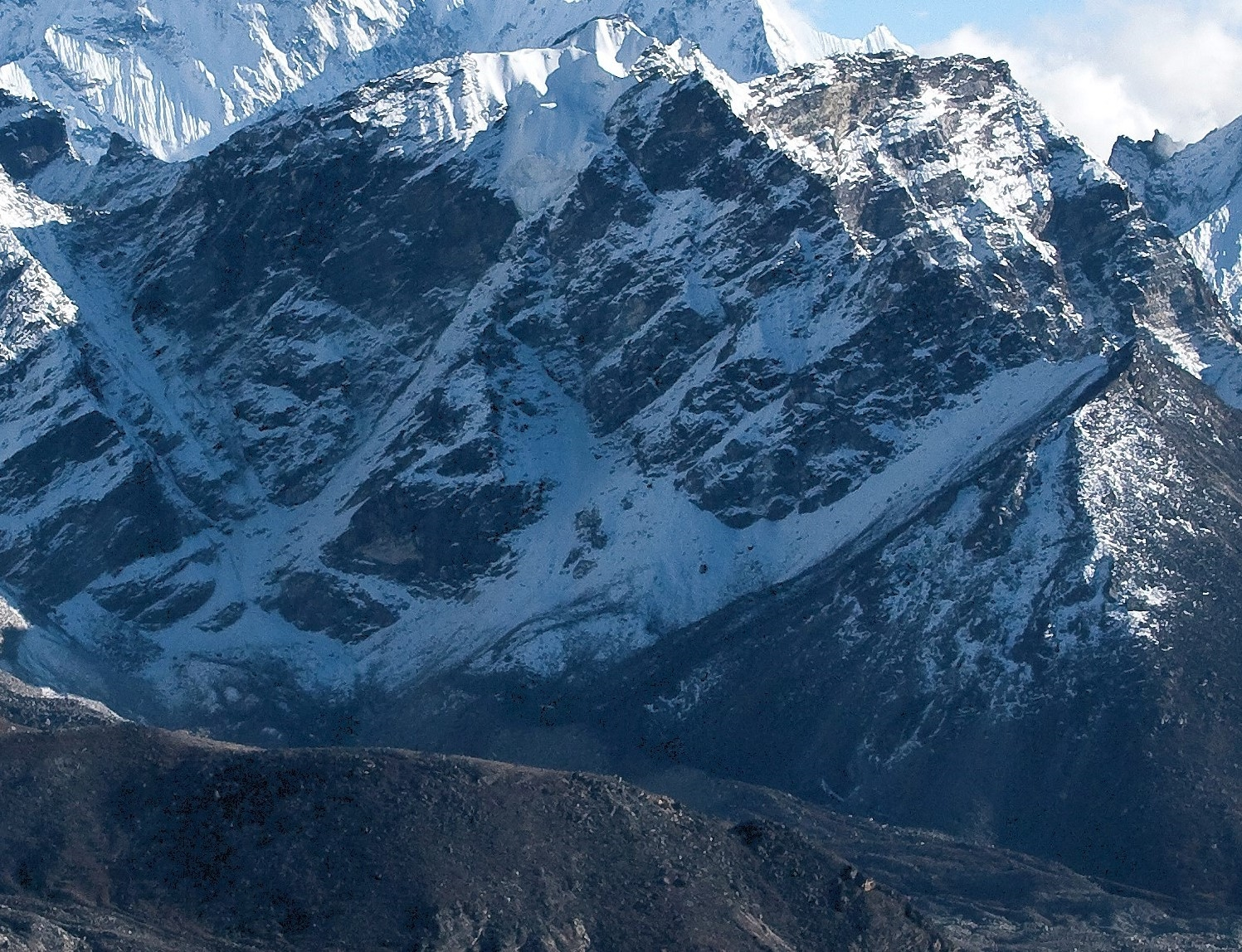
North aspect

== See also ==
- Geology of the Himalayas
