= Sibusiso Vilane =

South African adventurer and motivational speaker

Sibusiso Vilane OIB (born 5 December 1970, Shongwe Mission in Mpumalanga) is a South African adventurer, motivational speaker, and author of the book To the Top from Nowhere. An adventurer, marathon runner, mountaineer, and expedition leader, he has also served as the Chief Scout of Scouts South Africa.

Sibusiso has been married to Nomsa since 1995 and is the father of four – three girls and a boy.

== Early life ==
His Swazi mother and South African father moved the family to Swaziland where Vilane was schooled (from the age of 11). Sibusiso completed his O levels at the Mater Dolorosa school in Swaziland. After a time as a labourer and drawing on his experienced as a goatherder, Vilane began his working career as a game ranger at Malolotja Nature Reserve in Swaziland in 1993. In 1996, he met John Doble who became a friend and benefactor and who was instrumental in finding the necessary sponsorship for Vilane's Mount Everest summit expedition.

== Climbing career ==
Vilane started climbing in 1996 by summiting peaks in the Drakensberg. In 1999, he summited Kilimanjaro and went on to the Himalayas in 2002, successfully climbing Pokalde, Lobuche, and Island Peak, all of which are over 6,000 metres high, as part of his training for the Mount Everest expedition.

In March 2003, Vilane set off for the Himalayas again in his quest to be the first Black African to summit earth's highest mountain, Everest. He reached the summit on May 26, 2003.

On that day, South African President Thabo Mbeki congratulated him on his achievement. "In this, he has shown the heights we can all scale in life if we put our shoulder to the wheel and work at things without flagging. Sibusiso, you have done us proud!" In 2006, Vilane was awarded the Order of Ikhamanga (Bronze) by President Mbeki.

In 2005, Vilane reached the summit of Everest again with Sir Ranulph Fiennes and Alex Harris after accessing the peak from the North Ridge – the more difficult and statistically less-successful side. This achievement meant that he is the first black African to climb the world's highest peak twice and by two different routes. Three children's charities benefited from his climb: The Birth to Twenty Research Programme at Wits University, the Africa Foundation and the SOS Children's Village in Swaziland.

Since this climb, Vilane has completed all Seven Summits. In late 2007 Vilane and fellow climber, Alex Harris, embarked on an unsupported and unassisted trek to reach the South Pole which, when they completed the expedition on 17 January 2008, made Vilane and Harris the first South Africans to walk to the South Pole and Vilane the first black person to do so.

== Seven Summits timeline ==
1. Mount Kilimanjaro (Africa) 1999
2. Mount Everest (Asia) 2003 – South and 2005 – North
3. Aconcagua (South America) 2006
4. Mount Elbrus (Europe) 2006
5. Carstensz Pyramid (Oceania) 2006
6. Vinson Massif (Antarctica) 2006
7. Denali (North America) 2008

== North Pole expedition ==
Vilane arrived at the geographic North Pole on 12 April 2012. This is the final hurdle to becoming the first black person to complete the Three Poles Challenge. This expedition was dubbed The Goliath Challenge and sponsored by Virgin Money Insurance. In completion of the Three Poles Challenge and the Seven Summits, Vilane is also the first African to have achieved the Explorers Grand Slam.

== Humanitarian work ==
Since 2006, Vilane has been the African ambassador for Lifeline Energy (formerly the Free Play Foundation). He dedicated the 1,113 kilometres he trekked to the South Pole to the children of South Africa. In May 2008, as a result of this act and hundreds of sponsors supporting Vilane, Lifeline Energy was able to provide 300 Lifeline radios to children from the Nkomazi district, where Vilane was born. In 2013 Sibusiso became an official Ambassador to the Mandela Bangle programme, which benefits the Mandela Day School Library campaign through funds raised from bangle sales and donations to his "Participate for Good Expeditions".

"The future entirely depends on the education of children, their access to information to broaden their thinking and understanding of the ever-changing and challenging world" says Vilane.

Vilane is also a patron of the Global Offering (GO) projects and is an eco ambassador for Indalo Yethu, a government organisation which strives to raise awareness about the environment.

Vilane founded a running club called Born to Win. He has also hosted a radio show My Climb, Your Climb on 1485 Radio Today in which he interviewed black achievers about the challenges they faced and overcame in their careers and lives. He is patron of the Endangered Wildlife Trust's Conservation Leadership Group and currently shares his time between work at a private game reserve in Limpopo and his family in Nelspruit, Mpumalanga.

In December 2013, he was appointed Chief Scout of Scouts South Africa, a position he held until 2017.

== Highlights and achievements ==
On Thursday December 2011, Vilane was introduced to the Queen of the United Kingdom at a reception at Buckingham Palace. The reception was held to acknowledge those involved in mountaineering, adventurer and exploration. Also present was Sir Ranulph Fiennes, a friend of Vilane.

From 4 to 23 January, Vilane led his first out of Africa climbing expedition and guided a team of eleven South Africans up Aconcagua. This is the highest mountain in the southern hemisphere, the highest in South America and one of the Seven Summits. He helped five of the team members to the summit of this mountain including South Africa's youngest person to summit Aconcagua, Jayson Funnell (at age fifteen).

In 2012, Vilane became a fully-fledged member of the British Alpine Club.

Vilane has become the only Black South African to complete the Explorers Grand Slam known as the Three Poles Challenge: reaching the summit of Everest, South and North Pole. Vilane's last achievement of the three, the North Pole, took place in April 2012.

== Controversy ==
During July 2016, Sibusiso Vilane was the expedition lead, guiding a party of 40 climbers to the summit of Kilimanjaro. During the summit attempt a well known South African race and rally driver, Gugu Zulu, succumbed prior to reaching the summit due to unspecified illness.

"I asked him how he was, he said, 'I'm ok... I suspect there is some flu creeping in'." With tears rolling down his face, Vilane said he did not see any signs of an illness. "For me he was still cheerful."

World Organization of the Scout Movement
Preceded by Vukile Mehana	Chief Scout, South African Scout Association; 2013–2017	Succeeded by Brendon Hausberger
