= Mount Garmo =

Mountain in Tajikistan

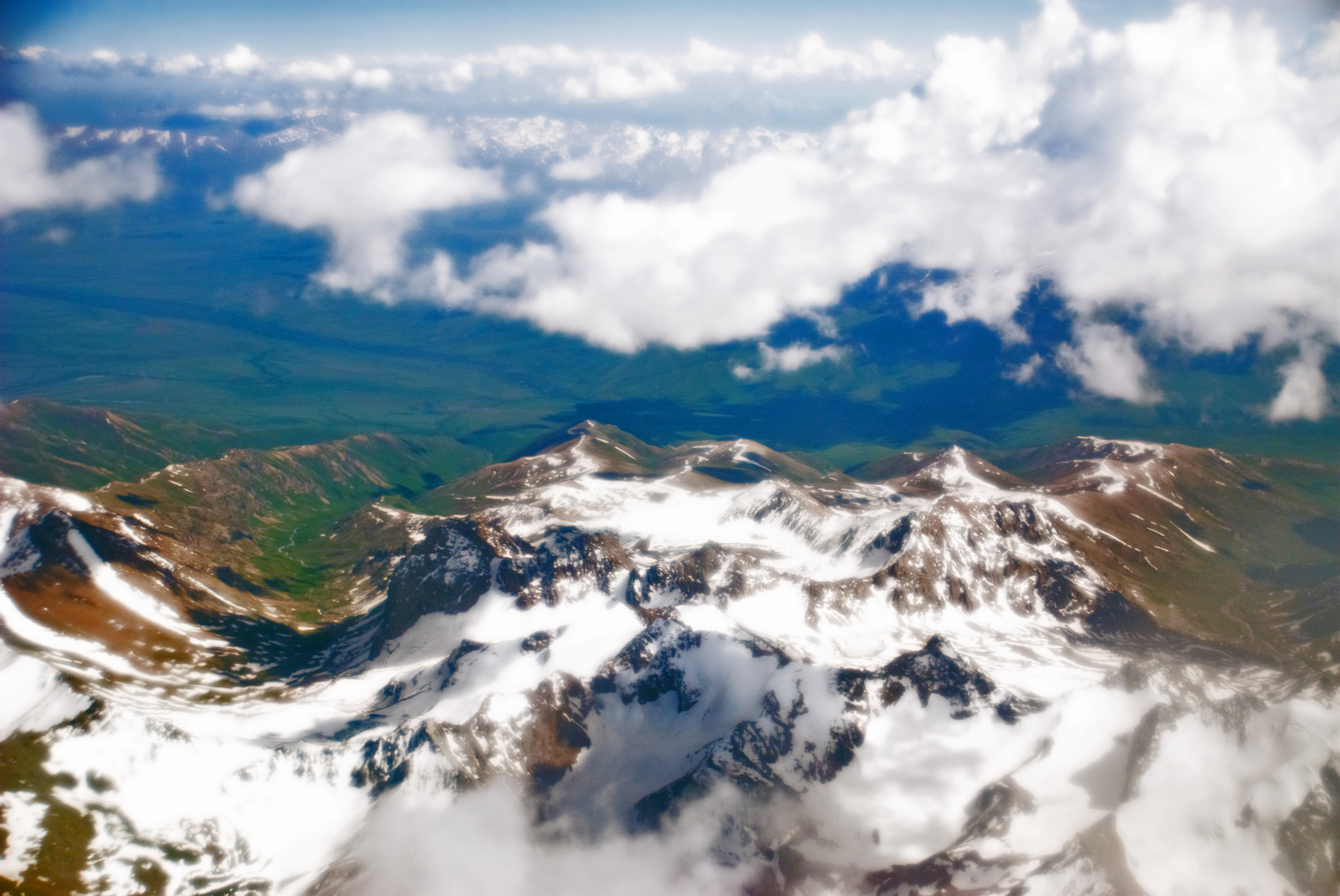
- The Pamirs

Highest point
- Elevation: 6,595 m (21,637 ft)
- Coordinates: 38°48′N 72°4′E

Geography
- Location within Tajikistan
- Location: Tajikistan, northwestern Gorno-Badakhshan
- Parent range: Pamir Mountains

Mount Garmo (Tajik: Қуллаи Гармо, Qullai Garmo) is a mountain of the Pamirs in Tajikistan, Central Asia, with a height reported to be between 6,595 metres and 6,602 metres.

There is a glacier on Mount Garmo, and the great Fedchenko Glacier (the longest glacier in the world outside the polar regions) flows to the east of it. The nearest settlement is at Poimazor, some fifteen kilometres to the south (38° 39' 10 N, 71° 58' 2 E), which is at an altitude of 2785 metres.

There has been some uncertainty about the location of Garmo and also about the true height of the peak which now bears that name. While the present consensus is around 6,595 metres, as recently as 1973 the American Alpine Journal gave the height as 21,703 feet (6,615 m).

== History ==
Formerly in the Soviet Union, Garmo forms part of the Academy of Sciences Range (Russian: Хребет Академии Наук; Tajik: Qatorkuhi Akademiyai Fanho) where it connects with the Darvoz Range.

A joint German-Russian expedition to the region in 1928 made the first ascent of Lenin Peak and also measured the height of what is now officially called Ismoil Somoni Peak, which may have been mistakenly identified with Garmo although it lies some sixteen kilometres to the north of the present Garmo.

In July 1962, two British climbers, Wilfrid Noyce and the young Scottish climber Robin Smith, died in a 4,000-foot (1,200 m) fall after an ascent of the peak, while preparing for a Soviet-British assault on Ismoil Somoni, which was then known as Pik Kommunizma (Peak Communism).

There were quarrels between the Russians and the British, and after the deaths of Noyce and Smith, Sir John Hunt, the expedition co-leader, returned to Britain. In 1964, the British press referred to Garmo as "21,800-foot Mount Garmo".

== Name confusion ==
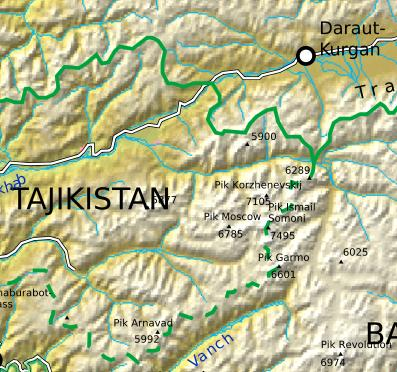
The Northern Pamirs

Since the 1920s and 1930s, the mountain has been confused with the higher peak now called Ismoil Somoni, which for some years was called Pik Stalin and is better known as Pik Kommunizma. A BBC quiz which was online in 2008 asks the question "By what name was Mount Garmo in Tajikistan known when it was the highest point in the Soviet Union?" and gives the answer "Mount Communism".

In The Ascent of Mount Stalin (1937), Michael Romm and Alec Brown state that "Darwas is renamed Pik Garmo, and Garmo is renamed Pik Stalin, the reasons given being far from convincing". And a paper published by The Permanent Committee on Geographical Names for British Official Use called Tajikistan, the Lofty Fastness of the Pamirs (November 2001) claims:

A final interesting point concerns the highest mountain peak in Tajikistan; indeed, the highest elevation in the entire former Soviet Union. This peak (at 3857N 7201E) has an altitude of 7495 metres. Until 1933, it was known as Pik Garmo, at which date that name was transferred to a lower peak to the south (3848N 7204E), where it still remains. The new name for the highest peak was Pik Stalina, which lasted until 1962, at which juncture the name of Stalin was removed and the mountain became known as Pik Kommunizma.

In 2008, a number of sources continued to identify Garmo with the highest mountain in the Pamirs, or else to give it a height above 7,000 metres.

== Bibliography ==
- Slesser, Malcolm Red Peak: A Personal Account of the British Soviet Expedition 1962 (London: Hodder & Stoughton, 1964)
- Sicouri, Paola, Kopylov, Vladimir, & Pierce, Richard A., Forbidden Mountains: The Most Beautiful Mountains in Russia and Central Asia (Milan: Indutech, 1994; US: Menasha Ridge Press Inc., 1997). ISBN 978-1-871890-88-4)
- Cruickshank, Jimmy, High Endeavours: The Life and Legend of Robin Smith (Edinburgh: Canongate, 2005). ISBN 978-1-84195-658-9

== See also ==
- Lenin Peak
- Peak Korzhenevskaya
