= Parchamo =

Mountain in Nepal

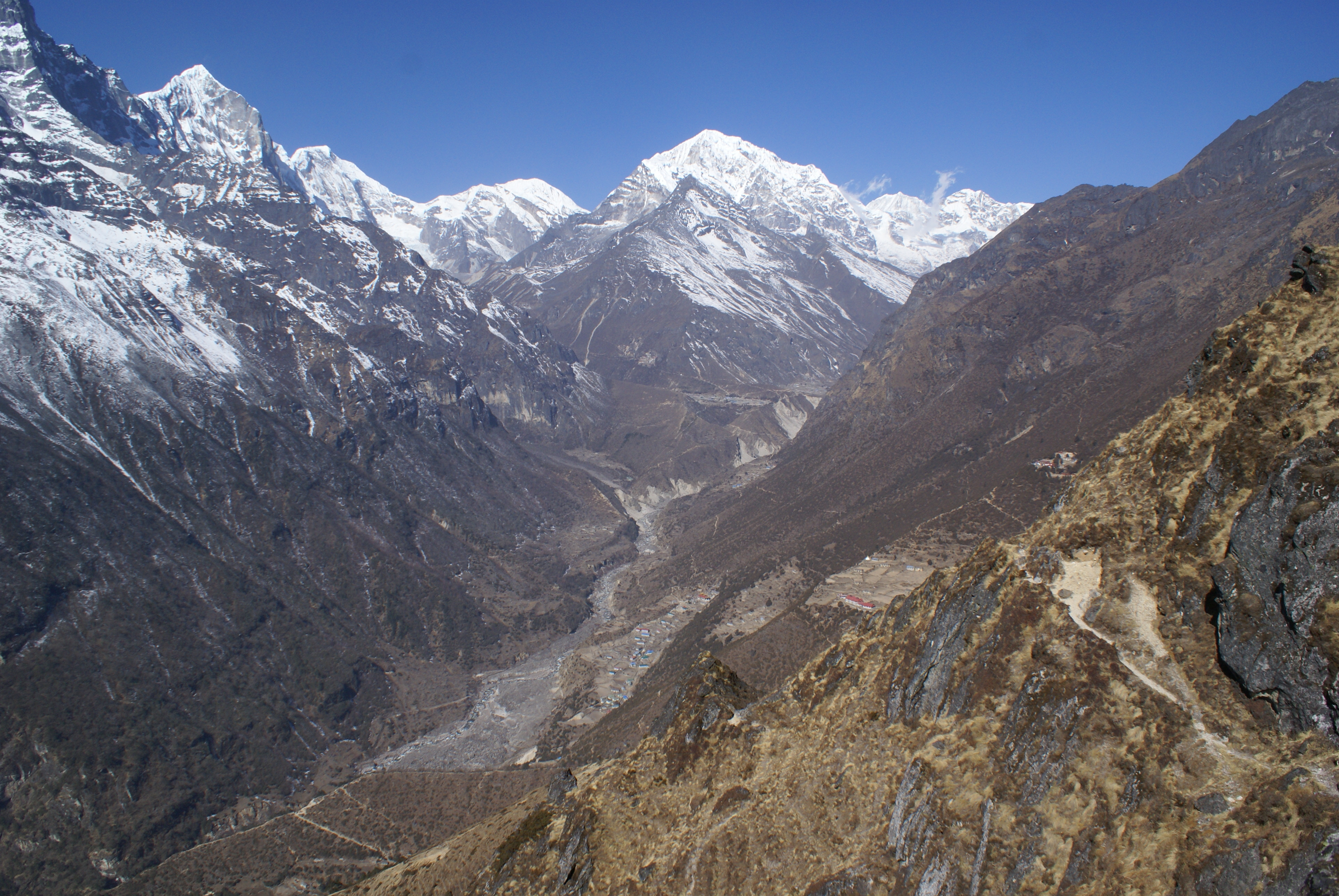
- Parchamo is the snow-capped lower mountain on the left of the center of the picture

Highest point
- Elevation: 6,187 m (20,299 ft)
- Coordinates: 27°50′11.66″N 86°32′50.78″E

Geography
- Location within Nepal
- Location: Rolwaling Himal, Nepal
- Parent range: Rolwaling Himal

Climbing
- First ascent: 18 April 1955 by Phil Boultbee und Dennis Davis
- Easiest route: snow/ice climb

Parchamo (also Pharchamo, Parchemuche, Parchoma, Pachermo Peak or Pachhermo Peak) is a 6,187 metres (20,299 ft) high trekking peak in the Rolwaling Himal mountain range of the Himalayas. It is located on the boundary between the Dolakha District and the Solukhumbu District of Nepal.

The summit offers a view of Mount Everest, Cho Oyu and Gyachung Kang with good visibility. On the north flank of Parchamo is the 5,755 metres (18,881 ft) high Tashi Lapcha (Tesi Lapcha) pass, which leads from the Drolambao glacier in the west to the mountain village of Namche Bazaar in the east. North of the Tashi Lapcha pass rises the 6,943 metres (22,779 ft) high Tengi Ragi Tau. To the south, a ridge leads from Parchamo to the 6,718 metres (22,041 ft) Likhu Chuli.

The first ascent of Parchamo was made by a UK expedition led by Alfred Gregory in 1955, Phil Boultbee and Dennis Davis reached the summit on 18 April 1955.
