= Singu Chuli =

Mountain in Nepal

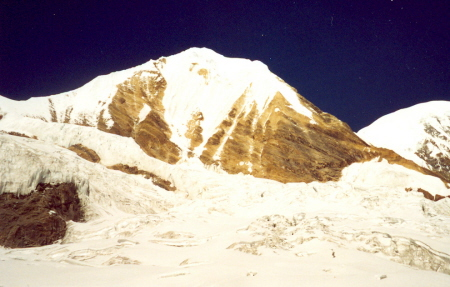
- Singu Chuli as viewed from the glacier between Singu and Tharpu Chuli

Highest point
- Elevation: 6,501 m (21,329 ft)
- Prominence: 504 m (1,654 ft)
- Listing: List of mountains in Nepal
- Coordinates: 28°35′14″N 83°52′59″E

Geography
- Location within Nepal
- Location: Annapurna, Nepal
- Parent range: Annapurna Himal

Climbing
- First ascent: June 13, 1957 by Wilfrid Noyce & David Cox
- Easiest route: snow ridge, ice climbing, rock climbing

Singu Chuli (also known as Fluted Peak) is one of the trekking peaks in the Nepali Himalaya range. The peak is located just west of Gangapurna in the Annapurna Himal. Singu Chuli is on a ridgeline originating at Tarke Kang going south. This ridge continues south of Singu Chuli to Tharpu Chuli. A climbing permit from the NMA costs US$350 for a team of up to four members. The peak requires ice climbing equipment.
