= Trekking peak =

Peak considered relatively easy to climb

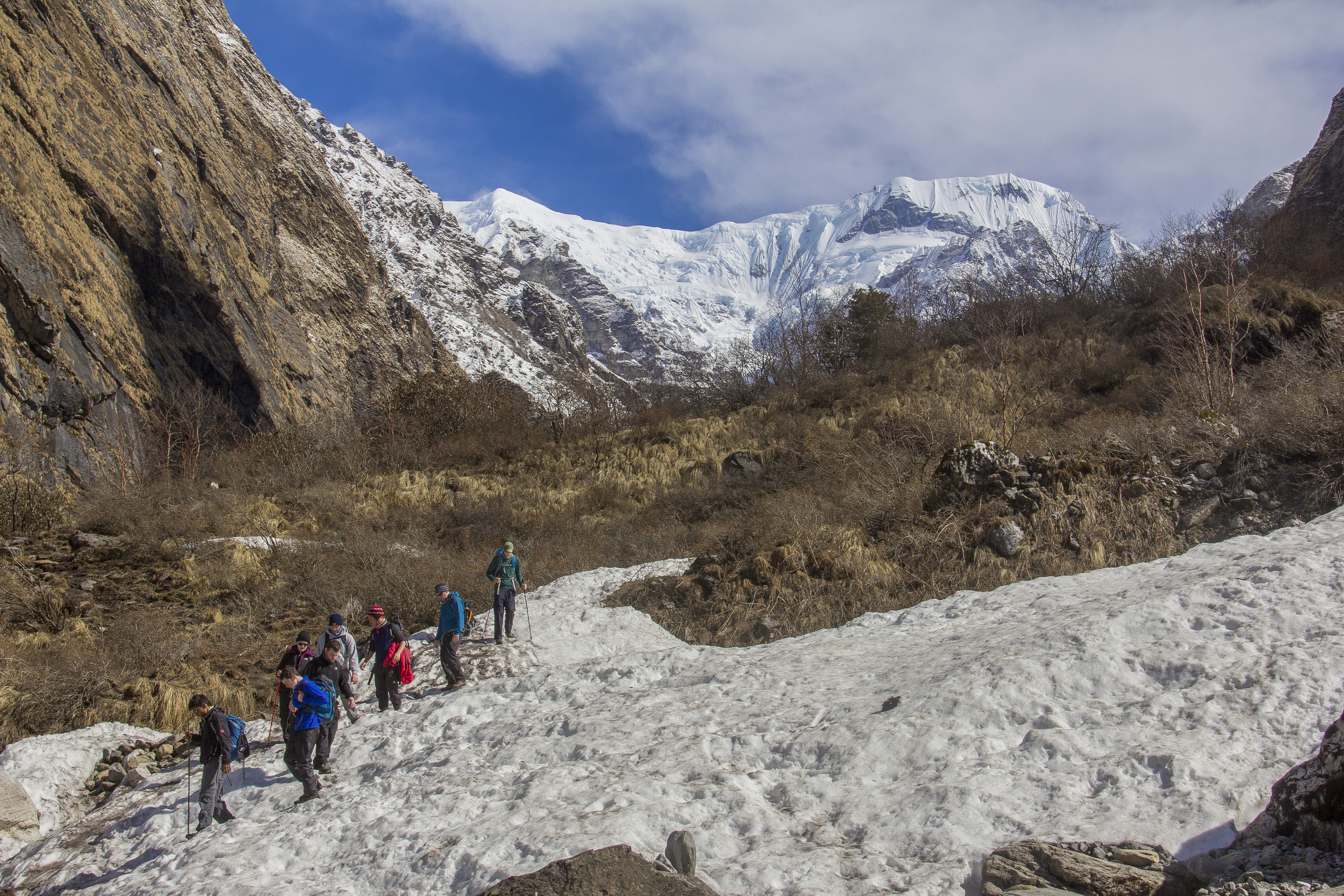
A team of hikers trekking through the Himalayas

The term "Trekking Peak" is a commonly misunderstood colloquial term which may refer to a variety of types of peaks in the Himalayan Region. The term is most often associated with NMA Climbing Peaks classified by the Nepal Mountaineering Association or easier. Some may use the term "Trekking Peak" to solely describe peaks requiring little to no technical climbing experience. Because of the term's loose classification of peaks it can be misleading, encompassing peaks of significant varying difficulties.

== Nepal ==
About 30 peaks are classified as NMA Peaks by the Nepal Mountaineering Association. These peaks do not exceed 7,000 metres (22,970 ft) in elevation and can be reasonably climbed from a base camp with the possible use of a high camp. To be climbed, these peaks typically require an amount of mountaineering experience and skills and the use of specialized mountaineering equipment, such as crampons and ice axes. The easiest routes to the summits of these mountains are all challenging enough to warrant a mountaineering difficulty grade by the International French Adjectival System. Here is a list of some NMA Peaks:

*A number of these peaks remain rarely climbed and therefore do not have clear associated climbing grades.
NMA Peaks	AKA	Elevation	Grade*	Himal
Singu Chuli	Fluted Peak	6,501 m (21,330 ft)	AD ?	Annapurna
Mera Peak		6,476 m (21,250 ft)	PD	Khumbu
Kusum Kanguru		6,367 m (20,890 ft)	D+ ?	Khumbu
Kwandge	Kongde Ri	6,011 m (19,720 ft)	D ?	Khumbu
Chulu West		6,419 m (21,060 ft)	PD-	Manang
Imja Tse	Island Peak	6,189 m (20,310 ft)	PD+	Khumbu
Pharchamo		6,187 m (20,300 ft)	?	Rolwaling
Lobuje	Lobuche	6,119 m (20,080 ft)	PD+	Khumbu
Ramdung		5,925 m (19,440 ft)	?	Rolwaling
Pisang Peak		6,091 m (19,980 ft)	PD	Manang
Chulu East		6,584 m (21,600 ft)	PD-	Damodar
Khongma-tse	Mehar Peak	5,820 m (19,090 ft)	?	Khumbu
Ganja-la Chuli	Naya Kanga	5,844 m (19,170 ft)	PD+	Langtang
Paldor Peak		5,928 m (19,450 ft)	F+	Langtang
Hiunchuli		6,441 m (21,130 ft)	?	Annapurna

In Nepal there are numerous peaks that require no technical expertise to climb, which may also be considered trekking peaks. These peaks are not tracked by the Nepal Mountaineering Association. Many of these peaks see a substantial number of summits each year by hikers and trekkers in the region without the use of specialized equipment. The routes to the summits of these mountains may not be challenging enough to warrant a mountaineering difficulty grade by the International French Adjectival System.

*Peaks without associated climbing grades do not pose enough mountaineering difficulty to meet the minimum standard of an IFAS Alpine grade of F("Facil/Easy")
Popular Low/Non-Technical Peaks	AKA	Elevation	Grade*	Himal
Yala Peak		5,500 m (18,040 ft)	F+	Langtang
Tharpu Chuli	Tent Peak	5,663 m (18,580 ft)	F	Annapurna
Pokalde	Dolma Ri	5,806 m (19,050 ft)	n/a	Khumbu
Gokyo Ri		5,357 m (17,580 ft)	n/a	Khumbu
Chhukung Ri		5,559 m (18,240 ft)	n/a	Khumbu
Kala Patthar		5,644 m (18,520 ft)	n/a	Khumbu

== India ==
The Indian Mountaineering Foundation defines trekking peaks as mountains that require technical mountaineering skills and equipment but are still climbable by "trekkers" who have some experience or obtain training. Climbers are not required to obtain permits from or pay royalties to the Indian Mountaineering Foundation. However, some peaks are located near the military line of control, meaning close to borders of neighboring countries and permission and permits may be required from local civil or army authorities for security reasons. Also, some peaks may be out of reach for foreign climbers.

The Indian Mountaineering Foundation has designated 3 trekking peaks in the Indian Himalayan Region.

IMF trekking peaks	Elevation	State
Friendship Peak	5,289 m (17,350 ft)	Himachal Pradesh
Ladakhi Peak	5,345 m (17,540 ft)	Himachal Pradesh
Stok Kangri	6,153 m (20,190 ft)	Ladakh
