= Tharpu Chuli =

Mountain in Nepal

- Tent Peak
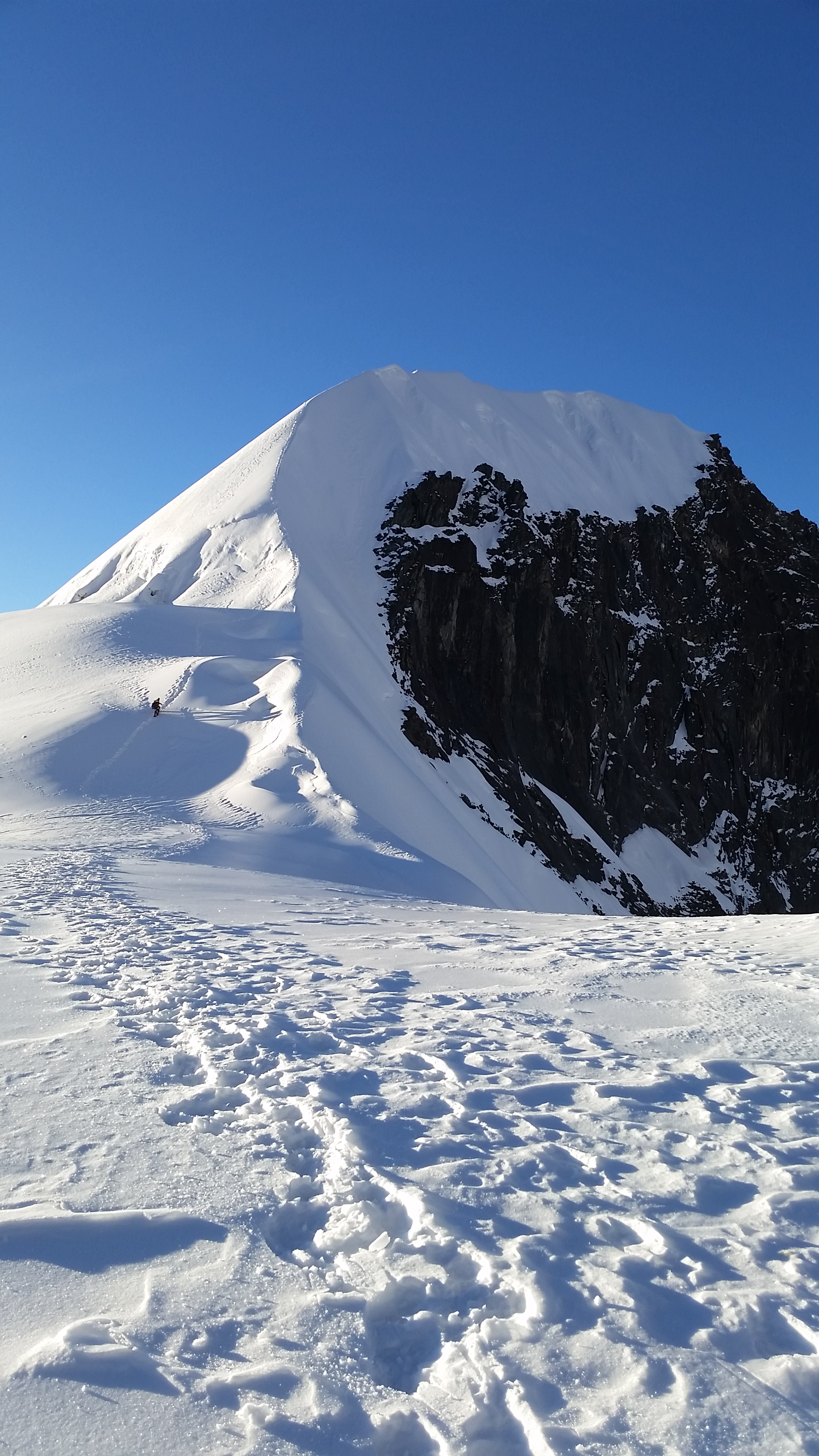
- View of Tharpu Chuli from the ridge line between Singu Chuli and Tharpu Chuli

Highest point
- Elevation: 5,695 m (18,684 ft)
- Prominence: 556 m (1,824 ft)
- Listing: List of mountains in Nepal
- Coordinates: 28°33′42″N 83°53′24″E

Geography
- Location within Nepal
- Location: Annapurna, Nepal
- Parent range: Himalayas

Climbing
- Easiest route: snow ridge, ice climbing

Tharpu Chuli or Tent Peak is one of the trekking peaks in the Nepali Himalaya range. The peak has a nice central position in the Annapurna Sanctuary. It is easier to climb than both Hiunchuli and Singu Chuli which also are trekking peaks of the Annapurna. The ascent requires ice climbing equipment. A climbing permit from the NMA used to cost US$350 for a team of up to four members. In 2017, Tharpu Chuli was removed from the NMA's list of Trekking Peaks.

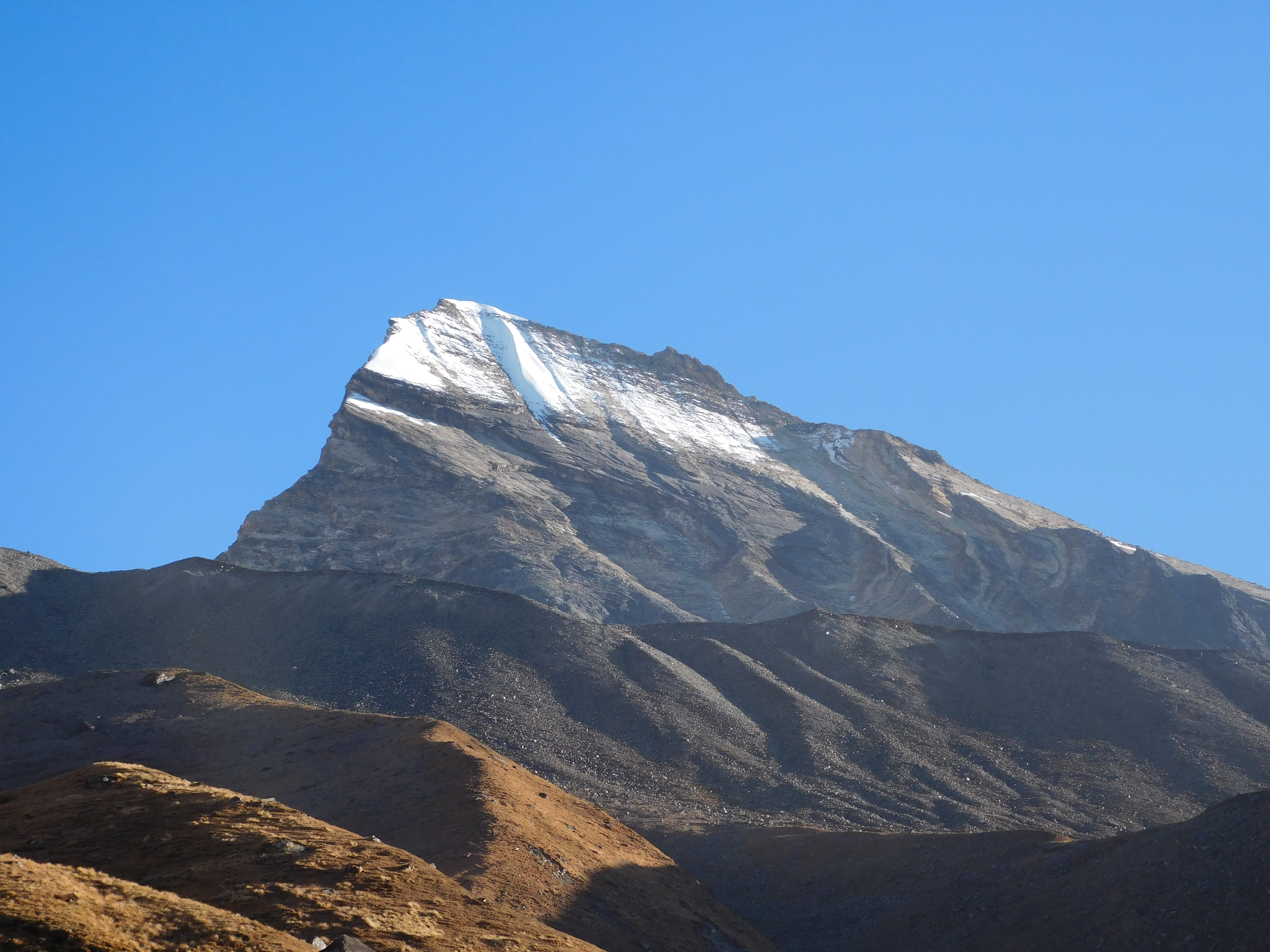
Tharpu Chuli Peak from Base Camp
