= Wouter Biesiot =

Wouter Biesiot (3 January 1951 – 27 April 1998) was an associate professor and the head of the Energy and Materials Group at the Interfacultaire Vakgroep Energie en Milieukunde at the University of Groningen.

Biesiot studied technical physics at Delft University of Technology from 1968 to 1975, and a PhD at the University of Groningen in nuclear physics in 1980. He may be best known for his work on response time and respite time. ECCO models were first developed by Malcolm Slesser et al. in Edinburgh in the late 1990s along with Jay Baguant, Anupam Saraph, Wouter Biesiot, Klaas Jan Noorman and Jane King.

He wrote two books on sustainability and was a prominent member of the Balaton Group. Biesiot died of colon cancer in April 1998.

== Bibliography ==
- Wouter. Biesiot, H. C. Moll, Reduction of CO2 emissions by lifestyle changes : final report to the NRP global air pollution and climate change, Rjksuniversiteit Groningen, 1995, ISBN 978-90-367-0525-7
- Henk A.J. Mulder and Wouter Biesiot, Transition to a sustainable society : a backcasting approach to modelling energy and ecology, Cheltenham, UK, 1998, ISBN 978-1858987316
