= Frank Noyce =

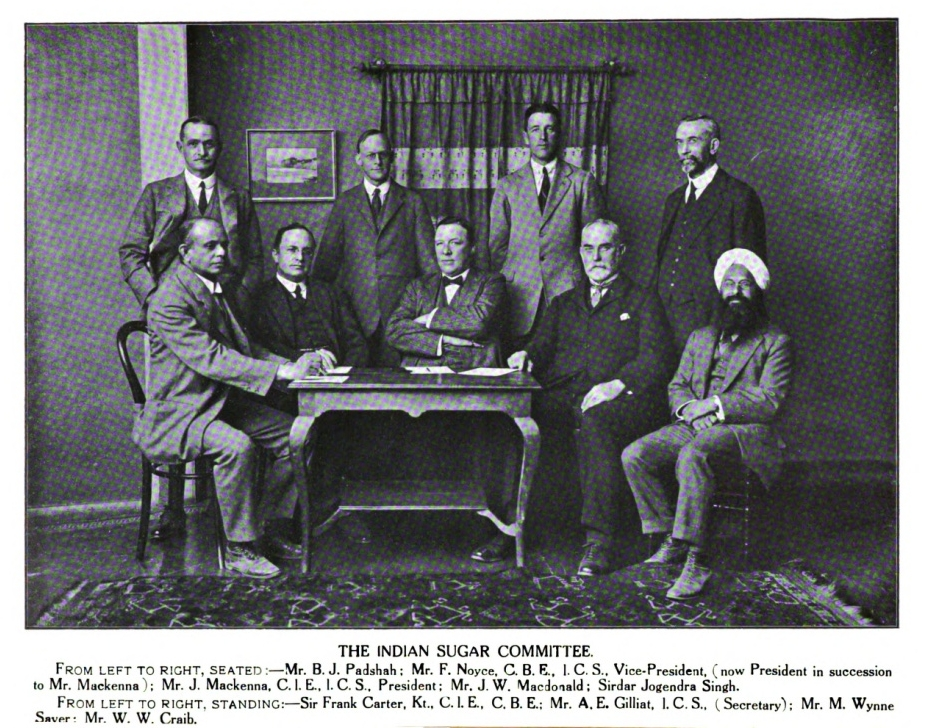
Noyce, seated second from left as part of the Sugar Committee of 1920

Sir Frank Noyce, KCSI, CBE (4 June 1878 – 7 October 1948) was a member of the Indian Civil Service and member of Governor-General's Executive Council in charge of industries and labour from 1932 to 1937. Noyce was also a member of the Indian Public Schools' Society, which was set up by Satish Ranjan Das in 1928 with the aim of establishing The Doon School, an all-boys public school modelled on Eton College and Harrow School.

Noyce was appointed a Companion of the Order of the Star of India (CSI) in the 1924 Birthday Honours.

His eldest son was the mountaineer and author Wilfrid Noyce, who was a member of the 1953 British Expedition that made the first ascent of Mount Everest.
