= Kongde Ri =

Mountain in Nepal

- Kwangde
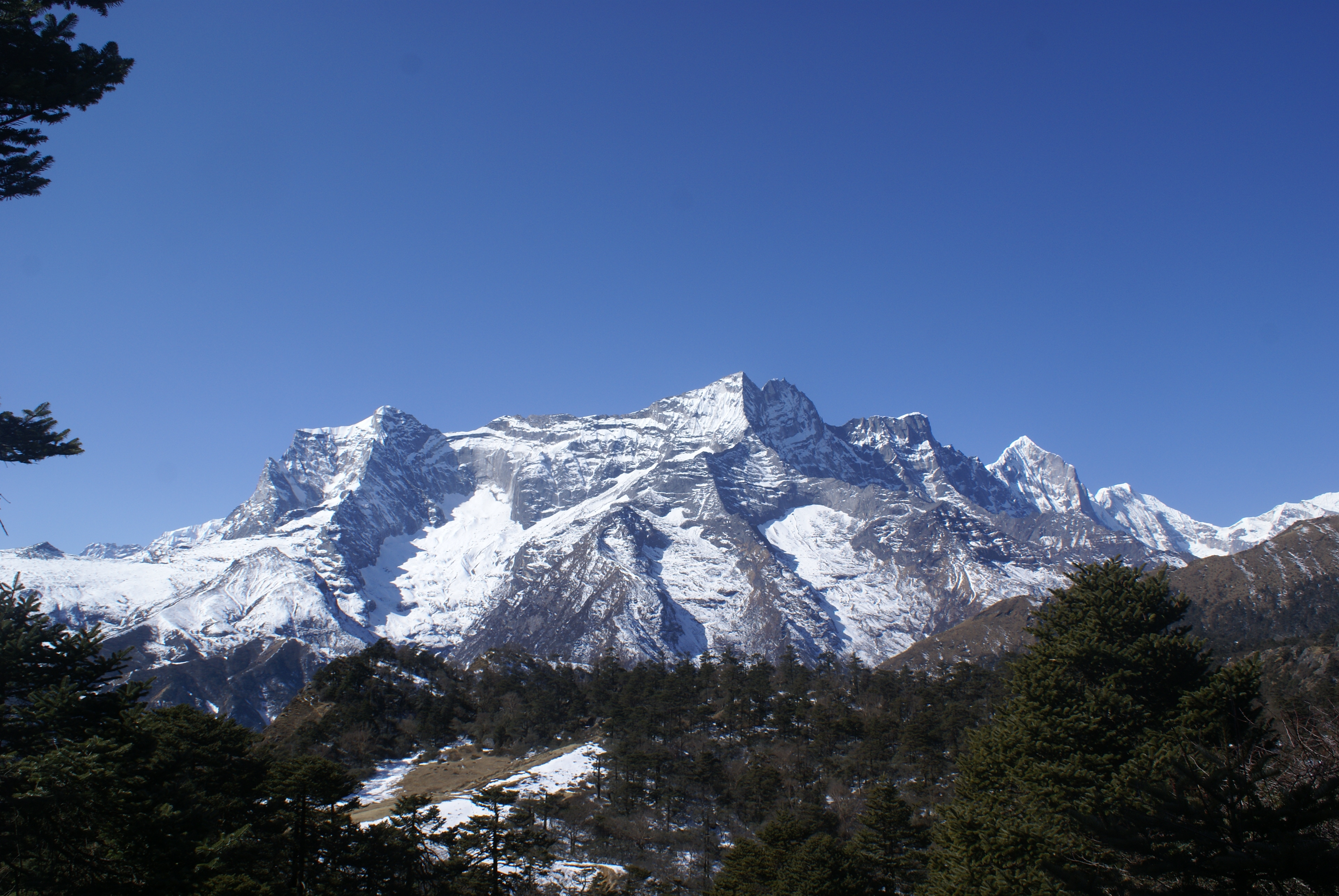
- Kongde Ri seen from Everest View Hotel above Namche Bazaar

Highest point
- Elevation: 6,187 m (20,299 ft) (Note: Other sources state 6086 m.)
- Prominence: 514 m (1,686 ft)
- Listing: Mountains of Nepal
- Coordinates: 27°47′35″N 86°38′34″E

Geography
- Location within Nepal
- Location: Khumbu, Nepal
- Parent range: Rolwaling Himal

Climbing
- First ascent: 1978; East Peak ascended in 1973 by a German team
- Easiest route: rock/snow climb

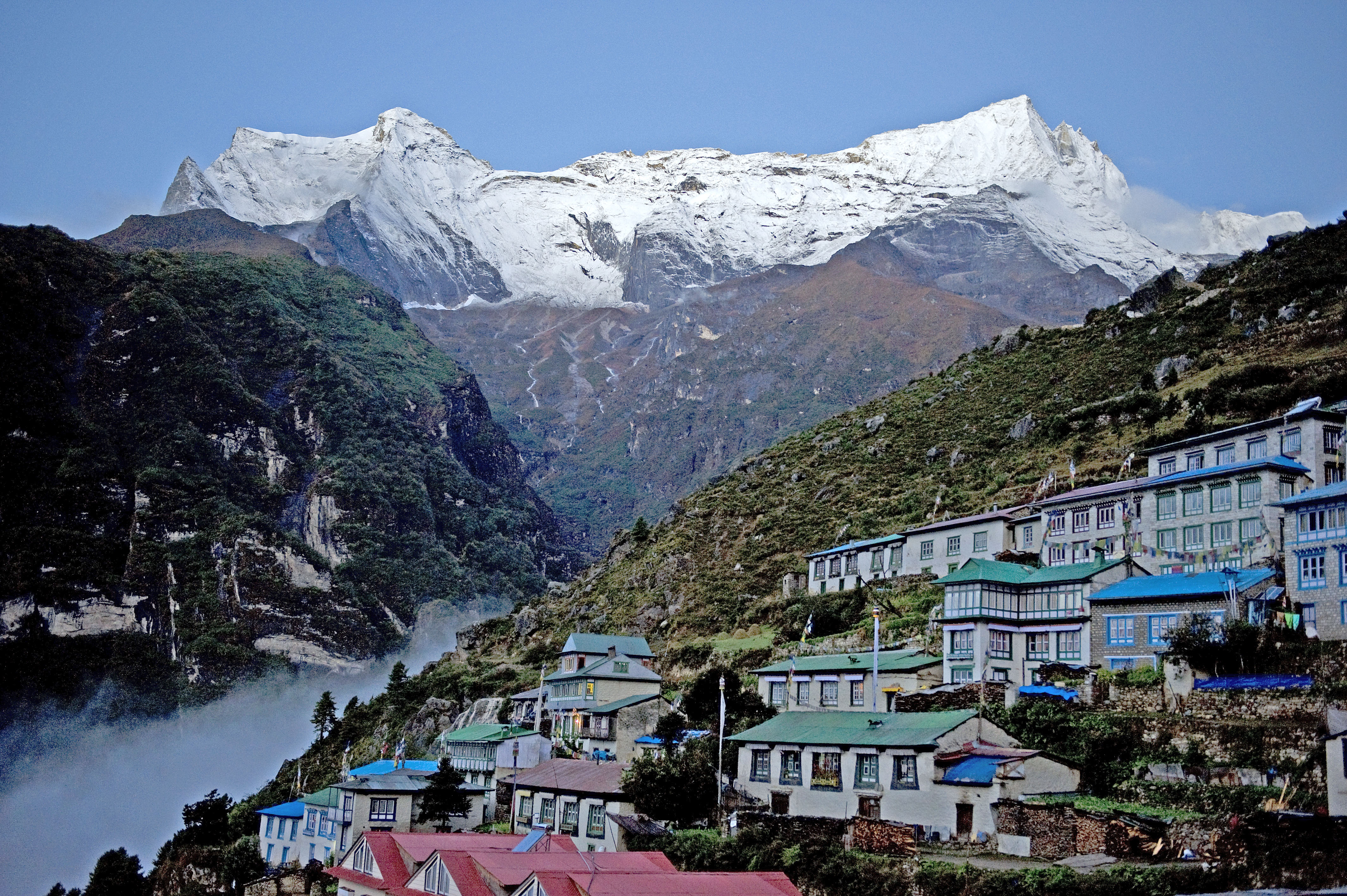
Kongde Ri viewed from Namche

Kongde Ri (sometimes Kwangde Ri) is a mountain in the Himalayas of eastern Nepal. The mountain is located 4 km west of Namche Bazaar.

A Japanese team made the first ascent of Kongde Ri on November 11, 1978. The mountain is classified as a trekking peak, but it is considered one of the more difficult ones to climb. A climbing permit costs from USD $175 (June to February) to $350 (March to May) per foreign climber.
