= Robin Smith (climber) =

British mountain climber

Robin Smith (30 August 1938 – July 1962) was a Scottish climber of the 1950s and early 1960s. He died together with Wilfrid Noyce in 1962 on a snow slope in the Pamirs, during an Anglo-Soviet expedition, at the age of 23.

== Life ==
Born in India, Smith was sent home to Scotland aged eight, attending Morrison's Academy in Crieff then boarding at George Watson's College. He enrolled at the University of Edinburgh in 1956, where he studied philosophy. However, with his entry into the University Mountaineering Club (EUMC) these studies were to remain in second place to his climbing obsession, but his academic abilities were more than apparent through his published commentary on his climbing exploits.

He planned to study for a doctorate in philosophy at University College London. He never married.

== Climbs ==
Smith left behind a string of more than 40 new summer and winter routes, many made at the highest level for the period and still considered as great classics of Scottish Mountaineering.

His ascent of Shibboleth on Buachaille Etive Mor's Slime Wall in Glencoe in June 1958 was particularly notable, as were his ascents of The Needle on Shelter Stone Crag in the Cairngorms and Yo-Yo on the north face of Aonach Dubh, the latter with David Hughes.

Although Smith was to climb with a variety of talented and notable partners there are two individuals with whom he was to be most productive. His partnership with Dougal Haston is probably the most well known, resulting in routes such as Gob on Carnmore in Wester Ross in April 1960 and Turnspit on Aonach Dubh in 1961. His account published in the Scottish Mountaineering Club Journal entitled "The Bat and the Wicked" described their bruising ascent of The Bat on the Carn Dearg Buttress of Ben Nevis; this piece has entered climbing folklore. Indeed, legend has that whilst discussing this buttress with the older and fiercely short-tempered Manchester climber Don Whillans, Smith was to remark that while Whillans had forged the groundbreaking routes of Centurion and Sassenach on Carn Dearg, Smith and Haston had simply climbed the difficult bit in between. The most recent Ben Nevis climbing guide refers to Smith's article, claiming that the climb was "named after the great swooping falls taken on the first ascent, much of which was reputedly climbed at night."

An even more productive partnership with the less well-known Jimmy Marshall was to result in a string of landmark first ascents. In one winter week on Ben Nevis in February 1960 they were to transform the shape of Scottish winter mountaineering. Using rudimentary ice-climbing gear, Smith and Marshall led six difficult and committing routes at the cutting edge of what was then possible. They also repeated Point Five Gully in seven hours, a route that had only been climbed once before the previous year by a team led by the English climber Ian Clough which took more than 40 hours over six days. Smith and Marshall were to interrupt their week with a single rest day involving descent to Fort William, a pub crawl and temporary arrest by the local constabulary over an incident with some dominoes. This brief respite was not to slow their pace, indeed their final day was to be one of the finest of their climbing careers with the ascent of Orion Direct, a climb alpine in atmosphere and so advanced that Scottish winter mountaineering had to wait a decade before changes in technique and equipment permitted a repeat. The events of this winter week with Marshall are repeated and celebrated in the film, ‘The Pinnacle’ (2010).

Smith's early death was to prevent the establishment of his reputation beyond the borders of the British Isles. However several summer alpine seasons saw him achieve a number of notable ascents. Although he was prevented from attempting the north face of the Eiger due to poor weather and an itinerant Haston, he was able to make the first British ascent of the Walker Spur on the north face of the Grandes Jorasses. Their ascent came just before that of another British party including Don Whillans and Hamish MacInnes.

== Death ==
Smith died in the Pamirs in July 1962. While descending from the summit of Mount Garmo he was roped to Wilfrid Noyce; a slip by one of them led them both to fall to their deaths. Due to the treacherous nature of the terrain in which their bodies fell their expedition companions, including John Hunt and Joe Brown, were forced to bury their bodies in a nearby crevasse.

== Sources ==
- Scotsman newspaper
- High Endeavours: The Life and Legend of Robin Smith, (ISBN 1841956589 ISBN 978-1-84195-658-9 )
- Ben Nevis: Rock and Ice Climbs, (ISBN 0-907521-42-8)
