= Anupam Saraph =

Indian academic

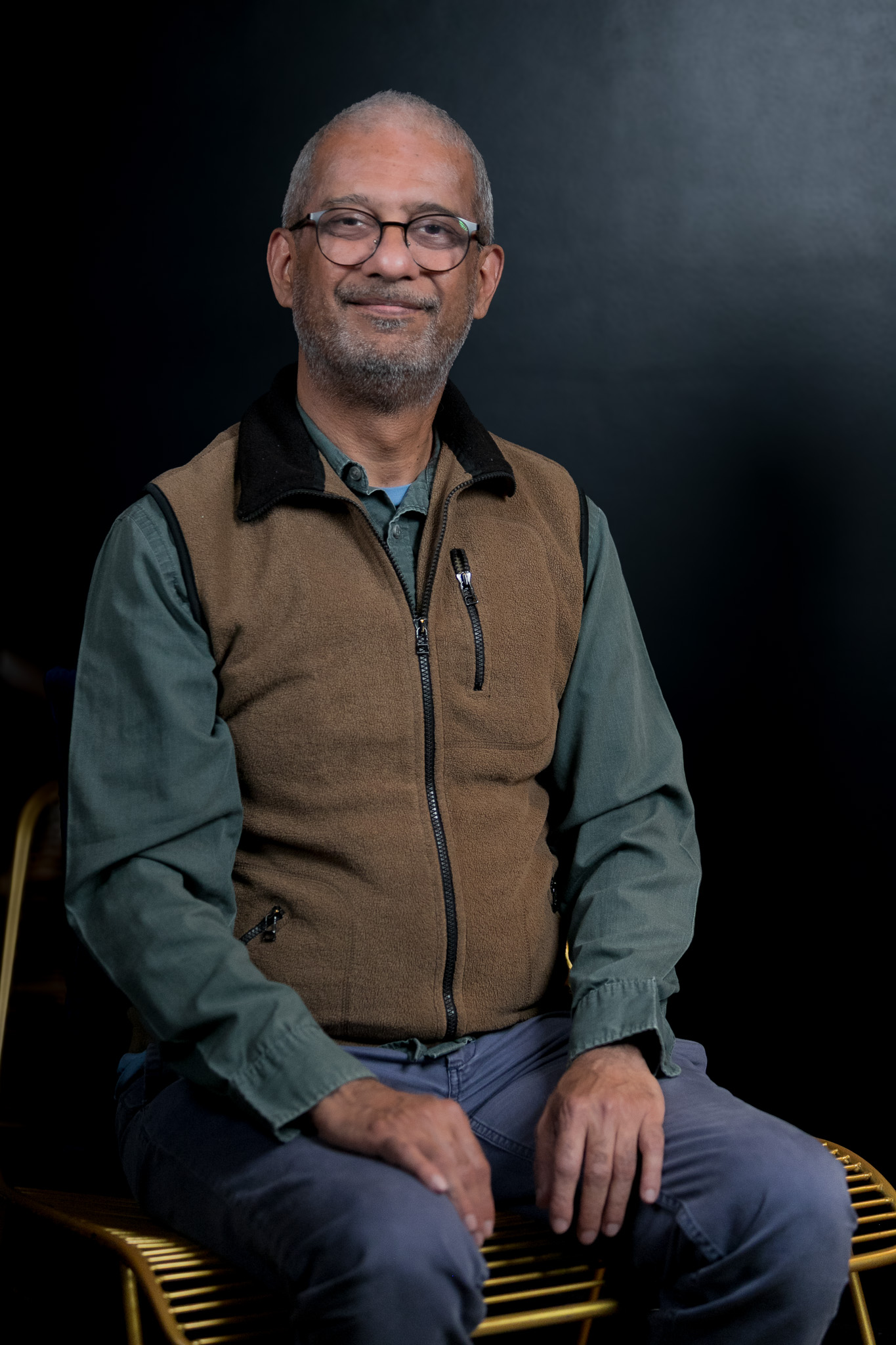
- Saraph in 2026
- Born: 31 August 1961; Nasik, India
- Known for: Syslogic, Theory of Organization of Systems, Economic Cycles, Crowd-sourced governance, Disruptive Governance, City Resource Planning and IT Designs for Urban India
- Scientific career
- Fields: Systems Sciences, Systems theory, Governance, Public Information Systems, Simulation and Modelling, Environmental Systems

Anupam Saraph is an innovator and polymath who has been an advisor in governance, informatics and strategic planning. Anupam Saraph obtained a PhD from the University of Groningen, Netherlands in Informatics while working with the IMAGE team at the RIVM and IVEM in the Netherlands.

== Career ==
Saraph has worked as a Research Assistant at the Tata Research Design and Development Centre, a research division of the Tata Consultancy Services. He also Worked with the Systems Research Institute in Pune.

He served as Vice-Chairman of the Infotech Corporation of Goa, a Public Sector undertaking of the Government of Goa. He has also consulted with multinational companies, large and small business houses in Asia and Europe.

He is also a Professor of Systems and Decision Sciences at the Lally School of Management and Technology at the Rensselaer Polytechnic Institute, Troy and Hartford Campuses where he taught courses on Information Systems and Business Statistics.

Anupam Saraph started his career with Donella Meadows on global modelling and systems theories Theory of Organization of Systems,. He is credited with the development of systems theories and simulation tools that model the behavior of actors in a system and explore the evolution of systems.

Anupam Saraph has also worked with Malcolm Slesser et al. in Edinburgh in the late 1990s to develop the ECCO modelling paradigm for assessing the economic and energy potentials of nations and regions. Slesser and Saraph are also credited with the 10th World Model, Monde, that allowed the common man to explore the impact of their actions on global sustainability. The work of Saraph and Slesser also allows development planning and help formulate economic policies.

== Contributions ==
- Saraph is the first CIO of any Indian City and has promoted and implemented revolutionary ideas on crowdsourced governance, His ideas are echoed in the creation of a Unique National Identity Authority of India by the Prime Minister of India.
- His message of smart cities, which he initiated in early 2008, has spread to other states in India, among infrastructure developers, as well as politicians opening up a trillion dollar market across India.
- He has been for introducing the use of social-networking tools in modern e-governance.
- He was appointed advisor to Manohar Parrikar during Parrikar's term as Chief Minister of Goa where he contributed to creating a digital society and introducing governance reforms
- He built wikis, twitter and google maps in public and private governance. He also designed and implemented the first worldwide governance wiki, Giki.
- He works with leaders across Asia, Europe and the Americas to mentor innovation, strategy and leadership that has resulted in significant value generation.
- He is an inspiring leader, having coached leadership across the globe in the Americas, Europe and Asia, building teams for better organization.

== Awards ==
- Saraph was selected one of the top CIO's for 2008 by the CIO Magazine
