= Wilfrid Noyce =

British mountain climber

Personal information
- Nationality: British
- Born: 31 December 1917 Simla, Punjab Province, British India (now Shimla, Himachal Pradesh, India)
- Died: 24 July 1962 (aged 44) Mount Garmo, Tajik SSR (now in Tajikistan)
- Occupations: Mountaineer, writer
- Parent: Sir Frank Noyce
- Relative: Colin Kirkus (cousin)

Climbing career
- Major ascents: First ascent of Machapuchare, May 1957; First ascent of Singu Chuli, June 1957

Cuthbert Wilfrid Francis Noyce (31 December 1917 – 24 July 1962) (usually known as Wilfrid Noyce (often misspelt as 'Wilfred'), some sources give third forename as Frank) was an English mountaineer and author. He was a member of the 1953 British Expedition that made the first ascent of Mount Everest.

== Life and family ==
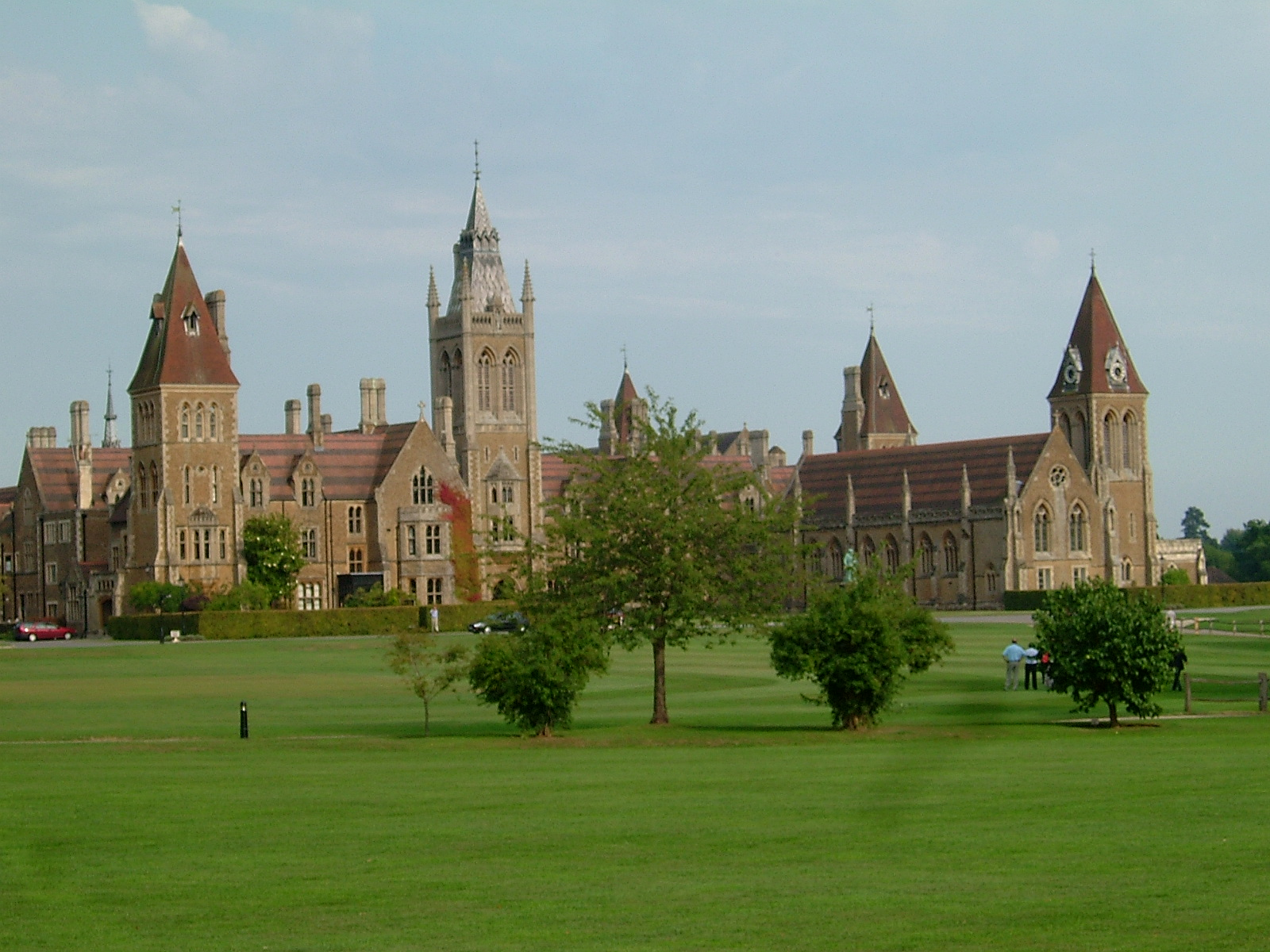
Charterhouse School, where Noyce was both head boy and a teacher

Noyce was born in 1917 in Simla, the British hill station in India. The eldest son of Sir Frank Noyce of the Indian Civil Service and his wife, Enid Isabel, a daughter of W. M. Kirkus of Liverpool, Noyce was educated at St Edmund's School, Hindhead and then Charterhouse, where he became head boy, and King's College, Cambridge, taking a first in Modern Languages. In the Second World War he was initially a conscientious objector, joining the Friends Ambulance Unit.

Noyce subsequently chose to serve as a private in the Welsh Guards, before being commissioned as a second lieutenant in the King's Royal Rifle Corps on 19 July 1941. He later attained the rank of captain in the Intelligence Corps. In February 1942 he joined the first course at the secret Bedford Japanese School run by Captain Oswald Tuck RN and after completing the course he was sent to the Military Wing at the Government Code and Cypher School, Bletchley Park. He was then sent to India where he was employed as a code-breaker at the Wireless Experimental Centre, Delhi. With Maurice Allen in spring 1943 they broke the Water Transport Code, an important Japanese Army code and the first high-level army code broken. John Hunt wrote that "...during a part of the war [Noyce] was employed in training air crews [in mountain techniques] in Kashmir. For a brief period he assisted me in running a similar course for soldiers".

After the war, Noyce became a schoolmaster. From 1946 until 1950 he taught modern languages at Malvern College. Then, following in the footsteps of George Mallory, he returned as a master to his own old school, Charterhouse, where he remained for ten years. On 12 August 1950, between Malvern and Charterhouse, he married Rosemary Campbell Davies, and they had two sons, Michael and Jeremy.

== Early climbing ==
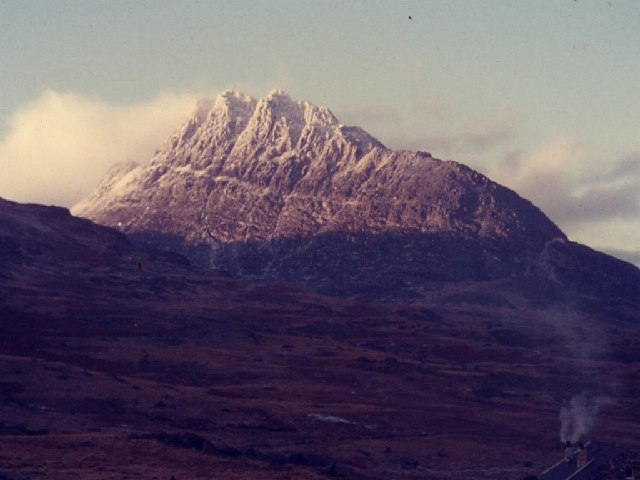
Tryfan

Colin Kirkus was Noyce's cousin, seven years older than Noyce. Kirkus developed an active interest in climbing during his early teens, the families of Kirkus and Noyce shared holidays in the Welsh hills. and it was Kirkus who first introduced Noyce to rock climbing.

By the age of eighteen, Noyce was already a fine climber, from 1935 regularly climbing with John Menlove Edwards of Liverpool. Before the Second World War, he helped Edwards to produce rock climbing guides to the crags of Tryfan and Lliwedd in Snowdonia. Like other leading British climbers of the prewar period, such as Mallory, Jack Longland, Ivan Waller and A. B. Hargreaves, Noyce became a protégé of Geoffrey Winthrop Young, attending his parties at Pen-y-Pass.

In the late 1930s, Noyce was one of a small band of Britons climbing at a high standard in the Alps. He was well known for his speed and stamina, and in two early alpine seasons, 1937 and 1938, climbing with Armand Charlet or Hans Brantschen as his guide, he made major climbs in very fast times. In 1942, in North Wales, he achieved a non-stop solo climb of 1,370 metres. During this period Noyce wrote that he suffered three serious accidents:

The first was a fall of 200 feet with a damp ledge that came away on the Mickledore Grooves of Scafell in 1937, when I was nineteen years old. The last, in 1946, found me blown bodily by a gust off an easy rib of Great Gable, onto my leg, which crumpled and broke under me [...] When I returned to the Alps and fells, it was often to introduce boys or to explore new corners. Though I still climbed rock, I preferred to be led at 'Very Severe' standard.

The first fall refers to an incident when he was held on the rope by Edwards after falling, despite damage to the rope.

== 1953 Everest Expedition ==
=== Background and approach ===
Noyce was a climbing member of the 1953 British Expedition to Mount Everest that made the first ascent of the mountain. According to the expedition's leader John Hunt, in the section of his The Ascent of Everest in which he outlined the qualities of his team members:

Wilfred Noyce is a schoolmaster and author, built on the same model as Lowe. Aged 34, he was, at the outbreak of the war in 1939, one of our foremost young mountaineers, with a very fine record of difficult routes in the Alps and on our own crags to his credit [...] He had climbed in Garhwal, and had made the ascent of one high peak in Sikkim, Paunhiri, 23,000 feet.

—

Edmund Hillary, meeting Noyce for the first time as the expedition assembled in Nepal, echoed Hunt's praise: "Wilf Noyce was a tough and experienced mountaineer with an impressive record of difficult and dangerous climbs. In many respects I considered Noyce the most competent British climber I had met."

At the initial meeting of the Everest team at the premises of the Royal Geographical Society on 17 November 1952, Noyce was designated as being charge of writing (meaning the dispatches that were to be sent home from the mountain) and "volunteered to help with the packing" (he aided Stuart Bain with this). On the walk-in to the mountain, Noyce, together with Charles Evans, who had been designated as in charge of stores at the RGS meeting, were designated as the "baggage party", in charge of the clothing and equipment for the approach. Noyce was also in charge of mountaineering equipment on the ascent itself, having been instructed in the repair of high-altitude boots ("I had worked for three days with Robert Lawrie's bootmakers, learning chiefly how to stick on micro-cellular rubber soles and heels"). Noyce's skills in boot repair were in demand on the ascent; according to Charles Wylie, the thin Vibram soles that were used on the boots often peeled off at the toes but Noyce "saved the situation with some really professional repair work".

Together with George Lowe, on 17 May Noyce established Camp VII on the Lhotse face of Everest. On 20 May he radioed to Hunt that many of the oxygen bottles (the training or Utility model, not the type that were to be used on the summit attempt) that had been ferried up to Camp VII were leaking. Hunt noted "Wilfrid, though gifted in more ways than one, has not a marked mechanical bent and we hoped his tests were not conclusive. Tom, however, had a lurking fear that these very tests, carried out by a possibly anoxic Wilfrid, might have resulted in the discharging of all nine cylinders".

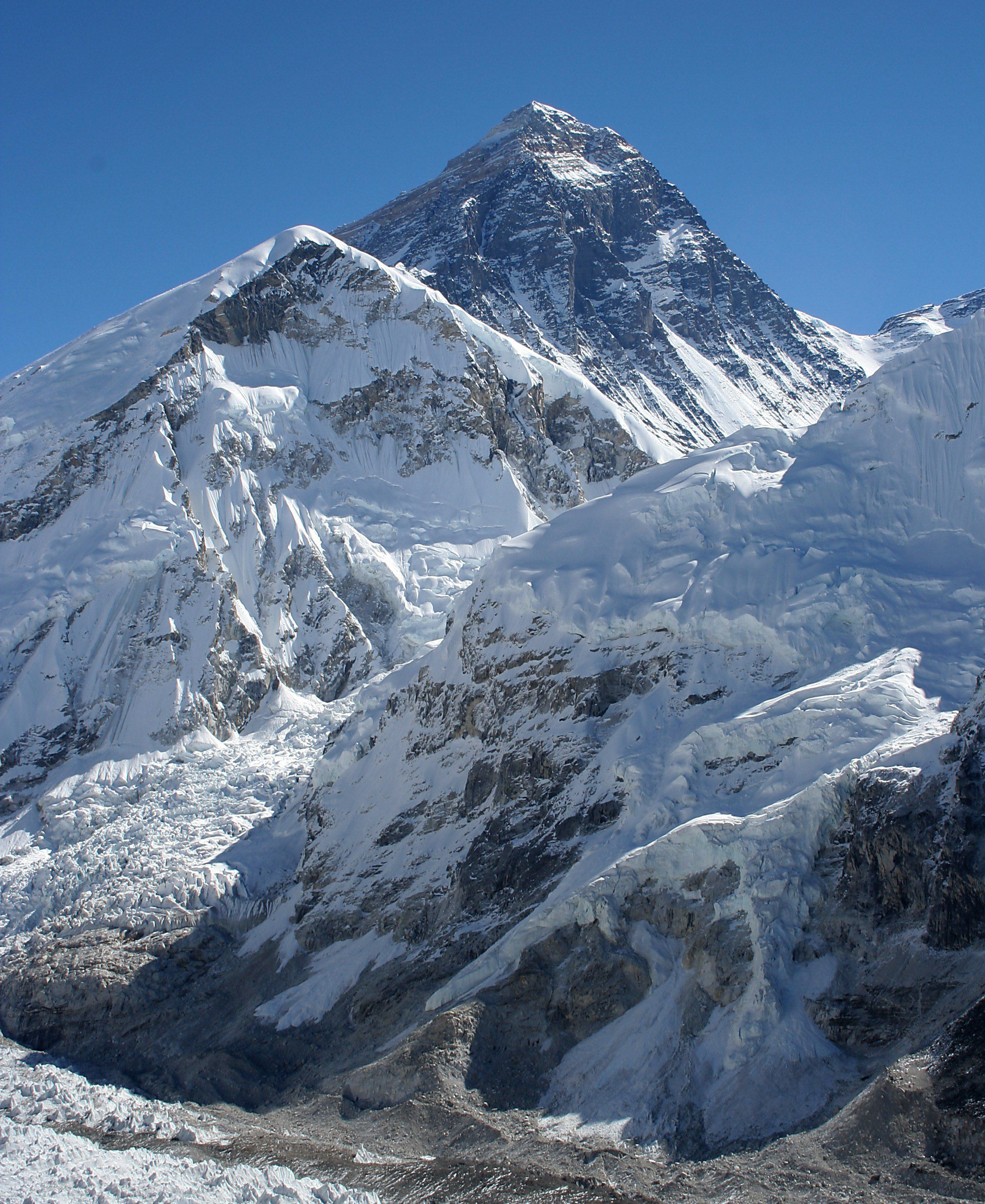
Mount Everest. The South Col is the lowest point of the sunny ridge in the right background

=== South Col ===
On 21 May Noyce and the Sherpa Annullu (the younger brother of Da Tensing) were the first members of the expedition to reach Everest's South Col, after what Noyce said was "one of the most enjoyable days' mountaineering I've ever had". They left Camp VII at 9.30 am, both using oxygen; according to Noyce, "I had told Anullu that we would not start too early, for fear of frostbite." Several hours later they reached the highest point attained by the British expedition to date: "an aluminium piton with a great coil of thick rope" left by George Lowe and party. The climbers in the camps below, according to Hunt, were watching their progress on this vital part of the climb; by early afternoon "their speed had noticeably increased and our excitement soon grew to amazement when it dawned on us that Noyce and Annullu were heading for the South Col itself".

Not long after Hunt made that observation, they reached the Col.

It was 2.40 p.m. Wilfrid Noyce and his companion Annullu stood at that moment above the South Col of Everest, at about 26,000 feet. They were gazing down on the scene of the Swiss drama, and they were also looking upwards to the final pyramid of Everest itself. It was a great moment for them both, and it was shared by all of us who watched it. Their presence there was symbolic of our success in overcoming the most crucial problem of the whole climb; they had reached an objective which we had been striving to attain for twelve anxious days.

—

In a passage in South Col, Noyce's book of the expedition published the following year, he gives an account of the scene that greeted him at the Col:

We were on a summit, overlooked in this whole scene only by Lhotse and Everest. And this was the scene long dreamed, long hoped for. To the right and above, the crenellations of Lhotse cut a blue sky fringed with snow cloudlets. To the left, snow mist still held Everest mysteriously. But the eye wandered hungry and fascinated over the plateau between; a space of boulders and bare ice perhaps four hundred yards square, absurdly solid and comforting at first glance in contrast with the sweeping ridges around, or the blank mist that masked the Tibetan hills beyond. But across it a noisy little wind moaned its warning that the South Col, goal of so many days' ambition, was not comfortable at all. And in among the glinting ice and dirty grey boulders there lay some yellow tatters – all that remained of the Swiss expedition of last year.

—

From the remains of the Swiss expedition Noyce "picked up some Vita-Weat, a tin of sardines and a box of matches, all in perfect condition after lying exposed to the elements for over six months". Noyce and Annullu fixed a 500-ft length of nylon rope to protect the steep slopes leading up to the Col where Camp VIII was to be established ("this was to be a moral lifeline for weary Sherpas returning from the long carry"), and then descended to Camp VII which they reached at 5.30 pm. From a mountaineering perspective, as Everest veteran Chris Bonington wrote, "[Noyce] had fulfilled his role in John Hunt's master plan, had established one vital stepping-stone for others to achieve the final goal."

According to Hunt, the climbing team had been in low spirits before Noyce and Annullu reached the South Col, but the effect of their safe return from the Col to Camp VII "had a profound impression on the waiting men. If these two could do it, so could they [...] Morale rose suddenly, inspired by fine example".

Noyce climbed up to the South Col a second time during the ascent; on 29 May, the day of the successful first ascent, he set out with three Sherpas from Camp VII, reaching the Col with one of them, Pasang Phutar, later that day; they "had each carried a double load—at least 50 lb.—from the point where the two other Sherpas had given up". Hunt noted that "Noyce and Wylie were the only two members of the climbing party to reach the South Col without oxygen."

Pasang, George Lowe and Noyce met the successful summit team of Edmund Hillary and Tenzing Norgay at the Col, giving the tired climbers drinks and congratulations. It was here, 200 metres above the camp, that Hillary told Lowe, who had gone out to greet them, "Well, we knocked the bastard off." Hillary wrote: "Wilf Noyce and Pasang Puta [sic] were also in Camp and they looked after us with patience and kindness. I felt a moment of sympathy for Wilf – he was the only one left with the strength to try for the summit; but now he wouldn't get the chance. It was another foul night with strong wind and very cold temperatures ..." Noyce descended the following day with Hillary, Tenzing, Lowe and Pasang Phutar, reaching Camp IV on 30 May.

As well as naming his book of the expedition South Col, Noyce also wrote a poem called 'South Col'.

== Later years ==
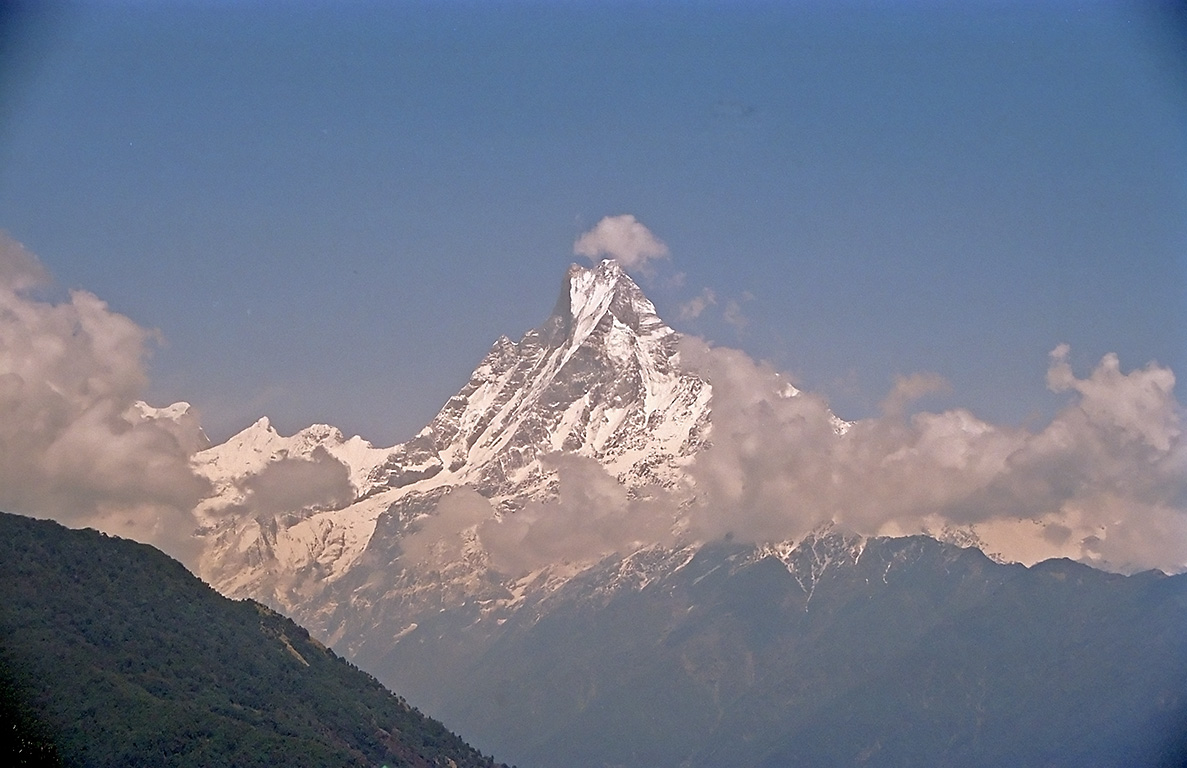
Machapuchare

On 20 May 1957, together with A. D. M. Cox, Noyce made the effective first ascent of Machapuchare (6,993 m) in the Annapurna Himal, reaching to within 50 m of the summit before turning back at that point out of respect for local religious beliefs. Noyce and Cox also made the first ascent – via the north-east face – of Singu Chuli (Fluted Peak) (6,501 m) on 13 June 1957. On 5 August 1959 Noyce, together with C. J. Mortlock and Jack Sadler, made the first British ascent of the Welzenbach route on the north face of the Dent d'Hérens. Some days later, on 15–16 August, the same party made the first British ascent of the north-east face of the Signalkuppe, the longest and most serious route on the east face of Monte Rosa.

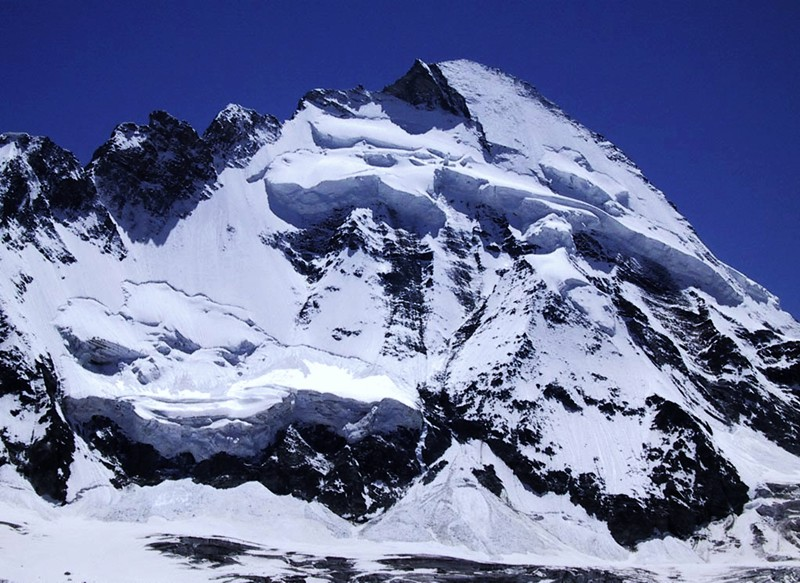
The north face of the Dent d'Hérens

Noyce made the first ascent of Trivor (7,577 m) in Pakistan's Hispar Muztagh range in 1960 together with Jack Sadler.

Noyce died in a mountaineering accident together with the 23-year-old Scot Robin Smith in 1962 after a successful ascent of Mount Garmo (6,595 m), in the Pamirs. Both climbers were part of a joint British–Soviet expedition, the first by westerners to the Pamirs, led by John (now Sir John) Hunt, whose ultimate objective was an ascent of Ismoil Somoni (7,485m), the highest peak in the range and known at the time as Pik Communism. On the descent of Mount Garmo, either Smith or Noyce slipped on a layer of soft snow over ice, pulling the other, and they both fell 4,000 feet (1,200 metres). Their bodies were buried nearby in the mountains.

== Writings ==
Noyce wrote widely, penning not just books, poems and scholarly articles, but also contributing to climbing guidebooks. His Scholar Mountaineers was a study of twelve writers and thinkers who had an association with mountains; these were Dante, Petrarch, Rousseau, Ferdinand de Saussure, Goethe, Wordsworth, Keats, Ruskin, Leslie Stephen, Nietzsche, Pope Pius XI and Robert Falcon Scott. In the introduction Noyce says that he chose these figures because:

[...] each has made his particular contribution to a certain feeling in us, a feeling which would not be quite the same had these men not lived. Without their example, our appreciation and exertions among hills would be the weaker.

== Bibliography of works by Noyce ==
- Scholar Mountaineers: Pioneers of Parnassus, London: Dennis Dobson, 1950
- Michael Angelo: a poem in twelve parts, with epilogue, London: William Heinemann, 1953
- Mountains and Men, London: Geoffrey Bles, 1947, 2nd ed. 1954
- South Col: One Man's Adventure on the Ascent of Everest, London: William Heinemann, 1954
- The Gods Are Angry, World Publishing, 1957
- Snowdon Biography, London: J. M. Dent, 1957
- The Springs of Adventure, London: John Murray, 1958
- Climbing the Fish's Tail, London, 1958
- Poems, London: William Heinemann, 1960
- They Survived: A Study of the Will to Live, London: William Heinemann, 1962
- To the Unknown Mountain: The Ascent of Trivor, London: William Heinemann, 1962
- The Alps, London: Putnam, 1963
- World Atlas of Mountaineering, London: Macmillan, 1970 (with Ian MacNorrin)
- (as translator, with John Hunt) Starlight and Storm by Gaston Rébuffat, Kaye, 1968

== Commemoration ==
The "Wilfrid Noyce Community Centre" in Godalming, Surrey – where Charterhouse is located – is named after him.
