= Lobuche =

Mountain in Khumbu, Nepal

Lobuche East
- Lobuje
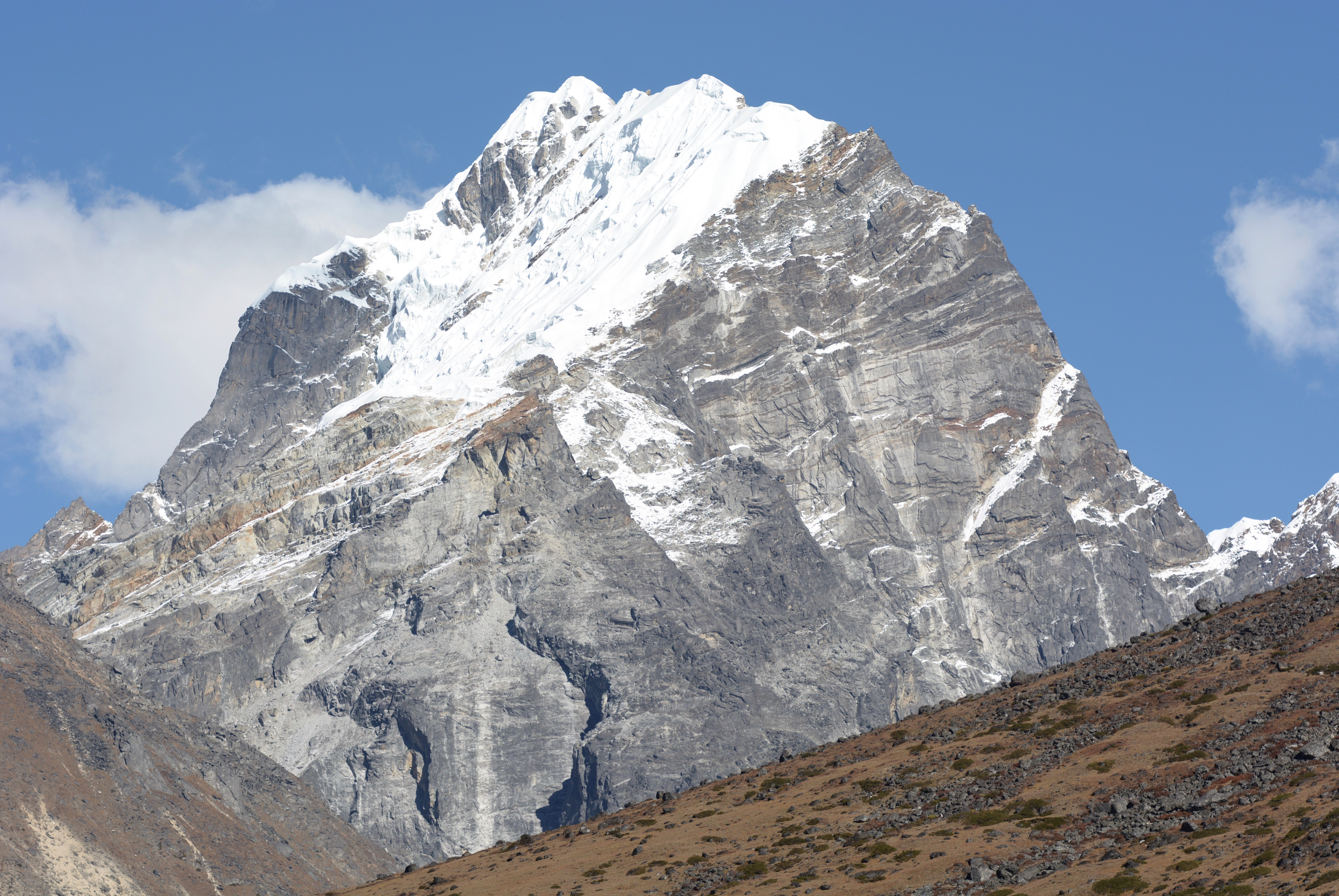
- Lobuche East from the southeast

Highest point
- Elevation: West: 6,145 m (20,161 ft); East: 6,119 m (20,075 ft)
- Coordinates: 27°57′34.2″N 86°47′23.8″E

Geography
- Location within Nepal
- Location: Khumbu, Nepal
- Parent range: Himalayas

Climbing
- First ascent: April 25, 1984
- Easiest route: Scramble/Rock/Snow Climb

Lobuche (also spelt Lobuje) is a Nepalese mountain which lies close to the Khumbu Glacier and the settlement of Lobuche. There are two main peaks, Lobuche East and Lobuche West. A permit to climb the mountain is required from the Nepal Mountaineering Association (NMA), which classifies Lobuche East (6,119m) as a "trekking peak" and Lobuche West (6,145m) as an "expedition peak". The permit is issued by Nepal Mountaineering Association and costs US$350 during spring, US$175 during autumn, and US$175 during winter/summer. The easier, trekking peak, the East peak is climbed far more frequently than the West peak; however, most of those climbers only do so to reach a false summit that is still a few hours from the true summit of Lobuche East. Between the two peaks is a long, deeply notched ridge, with a steep drop and its considerable distance making an approach of the West peak from the East practically impossible.

The first recorded ascent of Lobuche East was made by Laurence Nielson and Sherpa Ang Gyalzen on April 25, 1984.

Lobuche West was first climbed in 1955 via the South Shoulder.

== Name confusion ==
Many of the tourist operators offering treks and climbs to Lobuje refer to the two peaks as "Lobuche East" and "Lobuche Far East". The NMA - who own the mountain - however, refer to them as Lobuche West and Lobuche East.

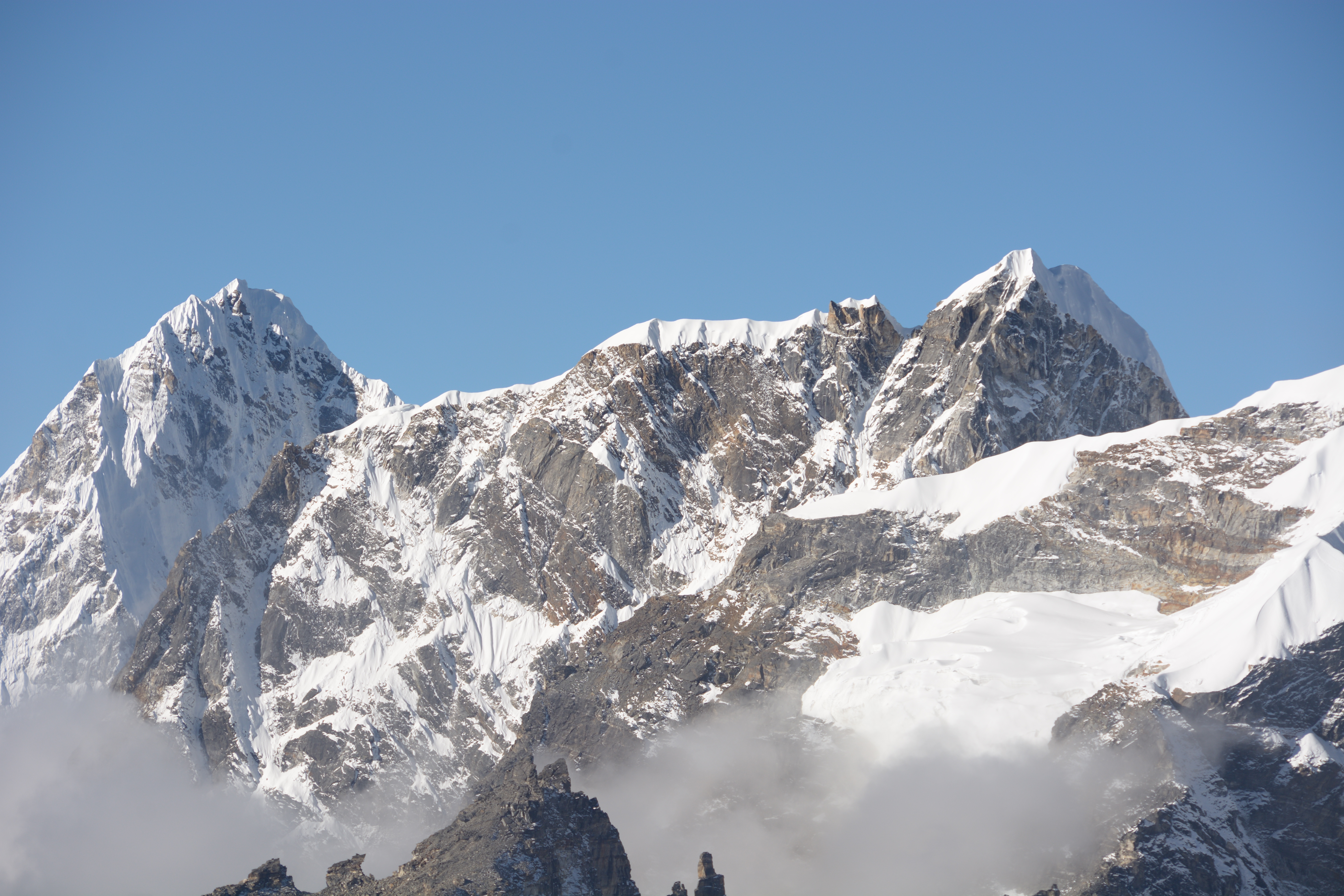
Lobuche East from the northeast

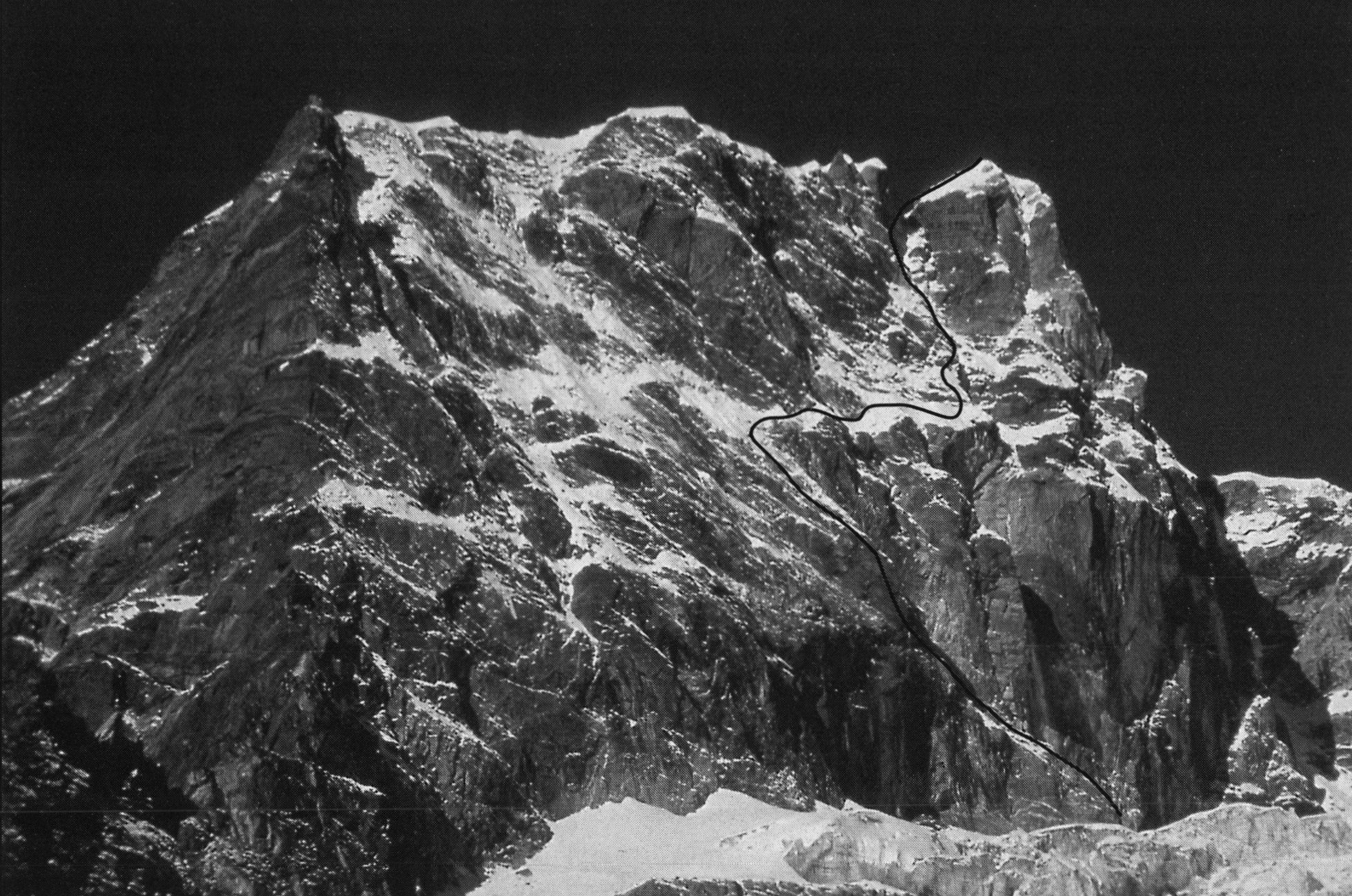
Lobuche East's northeast face route, "Talking About Tsampa"

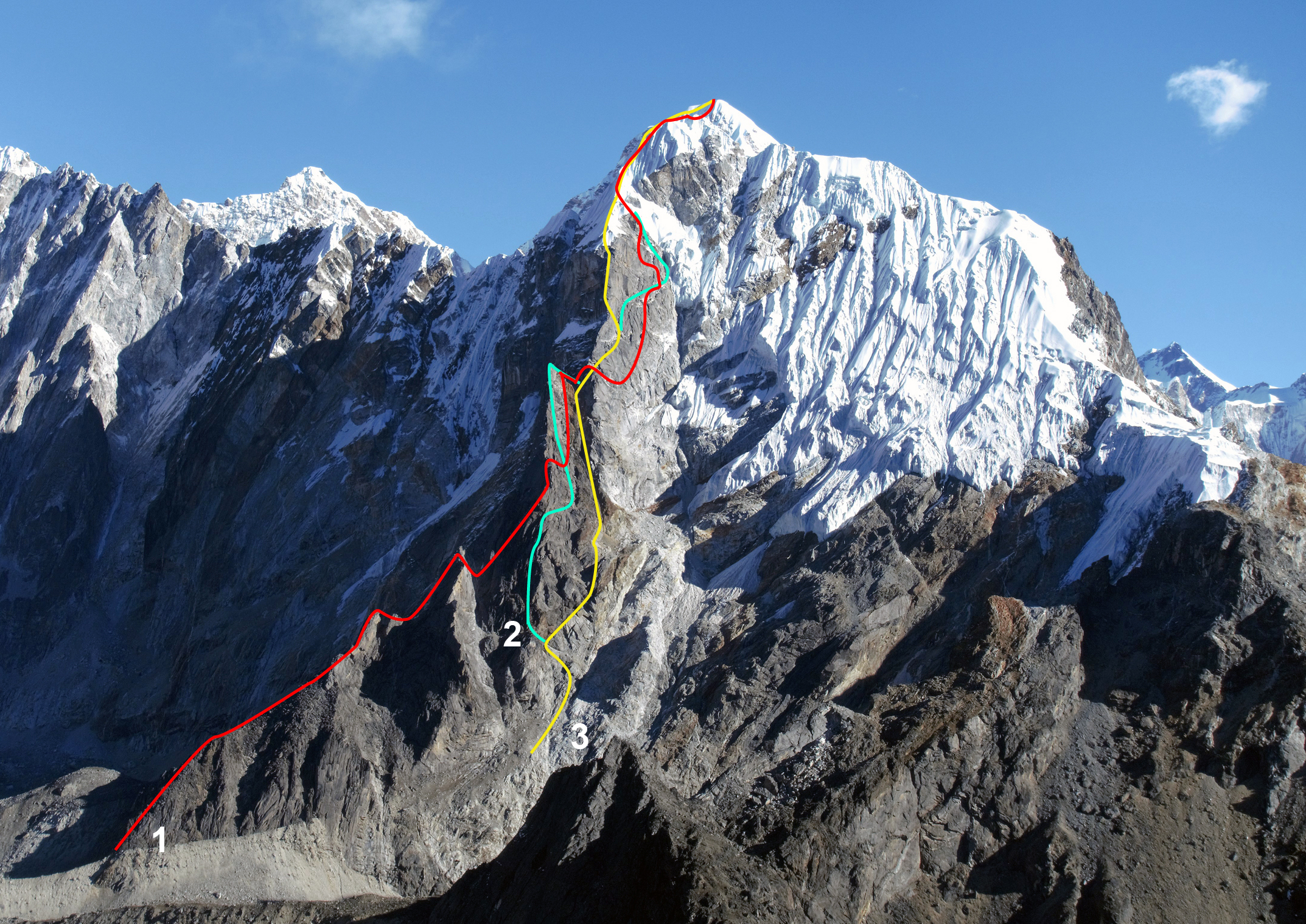
The southwest pillar of Lobuche East (6,090m), showing (1) Hiding in Plain Sight (2017), probably similar to the 1995 Spanish route; (2) 2018 French route, Le Quatuor à Cordes. (3) 1991 American-Nepalese Route. (Credit:Steve Fortune)

== Notable ascents ==
In 1998, from September 29 to October 1, Slovenians Tomaž Humar and Janez Jeglič and Mexican Carlos Carsolio climbed a new route on Lobuche East's northeast face in Alpine style. They named the route "Talking About Tsampa" (V-VI, 5.9, WI4, 85°, 900m).

Along the strikingly prominent southwestern pillar of Lobuche East, several routes have been completed. On a 1991 expedition, Eric Brand and Pemba Norbu used fixed ropes to climb the west pillar to the northwest summit (VI, 5.10, A3). In 1995, Carlos Miguel and Eduard Sanchez also climbed the west pillar by a 6b+ route with one aid pitch. They intersected with the Brand-Norbu route halfway up. In 2010, Americans Joel Kauffman and Jarad Vilhauer climbed a new route on the southwest face of Lobuje East (6119m) in Nepal's Khumbu region on October 30. They established "Night Terrors" (VI, WI5+, AI4, M7, 85°) in a 37-hour push from advance base camp to the summit, and then descended to base camp via the normal route (south spur).

In 2010, Antonin Cecchini, Laurent Thévenot, Aurélien Vaissière, and Symon Welfringer arrived at Dzongla village and started climbing a route similar to the one used for the 1995 Spanish ascent (by Miguel-Miranda-Sanchez), which took them two long days to complete, after which they traversed from the true summit towards the false summit and then descended the mountain, reaching Dzongla by midnight (the descent took 5 and a half hours). They named the route "Le Quatuor à Cordes" (6b, A2, M4, 80°, 1,100m).
