= Pokalde =

Mountain in Nepal

Pokalde Peak
- Dolma Ri
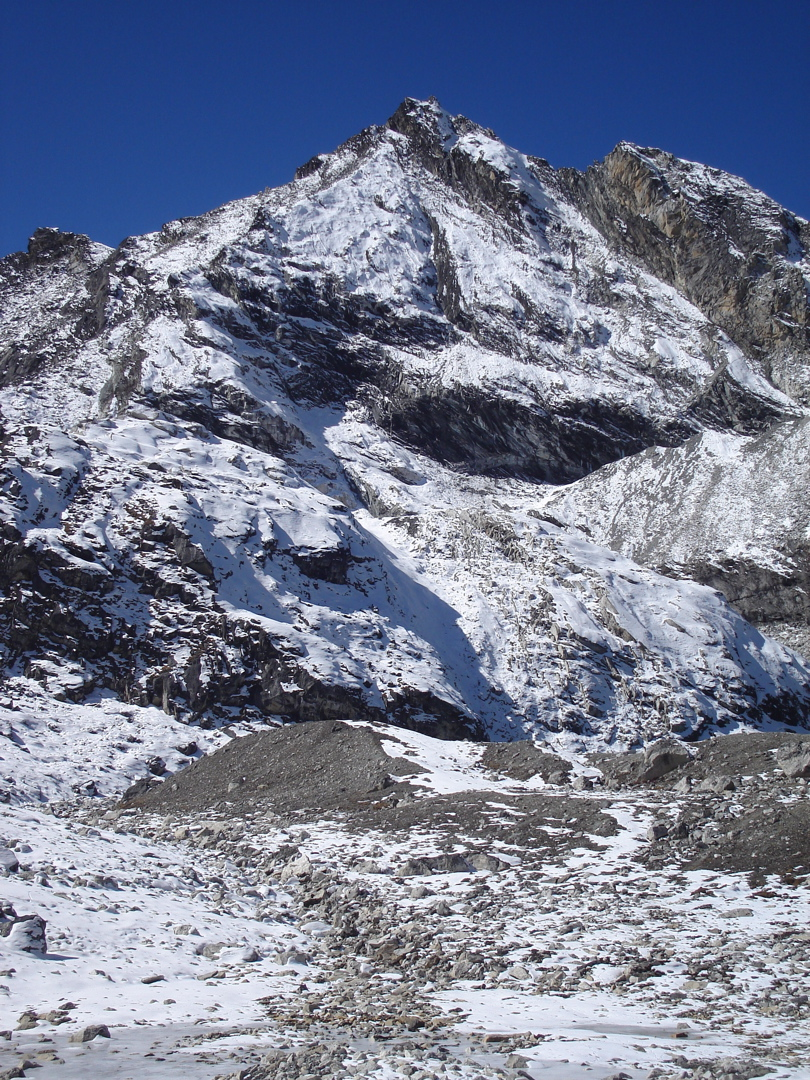
- Pokalde Peak as viewed from Base Camp

Highest point
- Elevation: 5,806 m (19,049 ft)
- Prominence: 296 m (971 ft)
- Listing: Mountains of Nepal
- Coordinates: 27°55′30″N 86°50′00″E

Geography
- Location within Nepal
- Location: Khumbu, Nepal
- Parent range: Himalayas

Climbing
- First ascent: April 15, 1953
- Easiest route: Scramble

Pokalde Peak (or Dolma Ri) is a mountain peak of Nepal situated 12 km southwest of Mount Everest. Pokalde Peak is one of the shortest and easiest trekking peaks in the Everest Region. The majority of the 650 metres (2,130 ft) climb from base camp requires little more than walking with short sections of scrambling up rock.

During the trekking seasons this rocky peak is scarcely covered by snow. Despite its lack of any great technical difficulty, it offers trekkers the prospect of reaching 5,800m in elevation and superb views from the summit, particularly to the South East, North West and West. Other prominent mountains visible from the summit include Makalu, Ama Dablam and Pumori. Because of its relatively low difficulty and impressive summit vista's for this altitude, Pokalde is a popular commercial tourist peak in Nepal for those wishing to climb a Himalayan peak without needing to use ice axes and crampons.

The first ascent of Pokalde Peak was made in April 1953 via the ridge adjoining the Pokalde summit with the Kongma La high pass (5535m). This ridge continues from Kongma La to the slightly higher Mehra Peak (Kongma Tse) at 5820m and beyond. Hence the prominence of Pokalde Peak is modest at 271m (889 feet). Most ascents of Pokalde Peak nowadays are made by skirting the opposite Makalu side of the mountain.

Pokalde Peak can be easily climbed in half a day by a fit and acclimatised group with appropriate leadership. Despite its low difficulty, sections of Pokalde are quite exposed so it shouldn't be attempted in poor weather. Doing so would significantly increase the difficulty of the climb above that of a "simple trekking peak". The final pitch to the summit also involves a short section of near vertical scrambling which for amateurs should definitely be protected by rope.

The base camp of Pokalde Peak is situated in a raised "amphitheatre" style valley with a large circular lake in the middle below the Kongma La pass. About 40 minutes from the base camp is the Kongma glacier. This glacier offers ice walls suitable for ice climbing training by appropriately equipped and motivated groups. The glacier is said to be receding in size.

Footprint evidence of significant snow leopard activity has been witnessed in the vicinity of Pokalde Peak base camp. This is despite the popularity of the area in being the gateway to both a major trekking peak as well as a high pass.

Even during the trekking seasons, it is not uncommon for overnight temperatures at base camp to be in excess of twenty degrees below freezing.
