= List of largest power stations =

A map of the world's power plants, April 2026

This article lists the largest power stations in the world, the ten overall and the five of each type, in terms of installed electrical capacity. Non-renewable power stations are those that run on coal, fuel oils, nuclear fuel, natural gas, oil shale and peat, while renewable power stations run on fuel sources such as biomass, geothermal, hydroelectric, solar, and wind. Only the most significant fuel source is listed for power stations that run on multiple sources.

As of 2025, the largest power generating facility ever built is the Three Gorges Dam in China, completed in 2012. The facility generates power by utilizing 32 Francis turbines for a total capacity of 22,500 MW. The eight largest power stations are also hydroelectric dams, beginning with Baihetan Dam, at 16,000 MW, also in China. The largest natural gas plant is Jebel Ali, UAE (8,695 MW) and the largest coal plant is Tuoketuo, China (6,720 MW). The largest nuclear plant is Kori, South Korea (7,489 MW) following the 2011 suspension of Kashiwazaki-Kariwa, Japan (7,965 MW).

In renewables, as of 2025, the largest solar farm is Gonghe Talatan Solar Park, China (21,000 MW) and the largest wind farm is Gansu Wind Farm, China (10,450 MW).

As of 2025, The Medog Dam, currently under construction on the Yarlung Tsangpo river in Mêdog County, China, expected to be completed by 2033, is planned to have a capacity of 60 GW, three times that of the Three Gorges Dam.

The capacity of the proposed Grand Inga Dam in the Democratic Republic of the Congo would surpass all existing power stations, including the Three Gorges Dam, if construction commences as planned. The design targets to top 39,000 MW in installed capacity, nearly twice that of the Three Gorges. Another proposal, Penzhin Tidal Power Plant Project, presumes an installed capacity up to 87,100 MW.

== Top 20 largest power producing facilities ==
Rank	Station	Image	Country	Location	Capacity (MW)	Annual generation (TWh)	Type	Refs
1	Three Gorges		China	30°49′15″N 111°00′08″E	22,500	78.79 (2022)	Hydro	
2	Gonghe Talatan		China	36°10′54″N 100°34′41″E	21,000	17.898	Solar PV	
3	Ningdong		China	37°58′23″N 106°52′18″E	18,000		Solar PV	
4	Baihetan		China	27°13′07″N 102°54′22″E	16,000	40.06 (2022)	Hydro	
5	Itaipu		Brazil; Paraguay	25°24′31″S 54°35′21″W	14,000	83.88 (2023)	Hydro	
6	Xiluodu		China	28°15′52″N 103°38′47″E	13,860	57.8 (2022)	Hydro	
7	Belo Monte		Brazil	03°07′27″S 51°42′01″W	11,233	39.5 (average)	Hydro	(Note: Installation of the 18th and final turbine was completed in November 2019.)
8	Guri		Venezuela	07°45′59″N 62°59′57″W	10,235	47 (average)	Hydro	
9	Wudongde		China	26°19′29″N 102°38′03″E	10,200	36.61 (2022)	Hydro	
10	Jebel Ali		United Arab Emirates	25°03′35″N 55°07′02″E	8,695		Natural gas	
11	Tucuruí		Brazil	03°49′53″S 49°38′36″W	8,370	21.4 (average)	Hydro	
−	Kashiwazaki-Kariwa		Japan	37°25′45″N 138°35′43″E	7,965	60.3 (1999-2011); 0 (2012–)	Nuclear (Note: Suspended in 2011. Restarted in April 2025. (Note: Present States of Operation (All units) Suspended (Periodic Inspection) Nuclear Regulation Authority))	
12	Jiuquan (Gansu)		China	40°12′00″N 96°54′00″E	7,965		Wind	
13	Xiangjiaba		China	28°38′57″N 104°22′14″E	7,798	31.55 (2022)	Hydro	
14	Robert-Bourassa generating station		Canada	53°47′43″N 77°26′26″W	7,722	37.4 (estimated)	Hydro	
15	Kori		South Korea	35°19′40″N 129°18′03″E	7,489	53.05 (2023)	Nuclear (Note: Largest operational nuclear power station since September 2019)	
16	Hanul		South Korea	37°05′34″N 129°23′01″E	7,268	54.62 (2023)	Nuclear	
17	Grand Coulee		United States	47°57′23″N 118°58′56″W	6,809	20.24 (average)	Hydro (Note: Largest in North America since 1949.)	
18	Tuoketuo		China	40°11′49″N 111°21′52″E	6,720	33.32	Coal (Note: Largest coal-fired power station since 2017.)	
19	Bruce		Canada	44°19′31″N 81°35′58″W	6,610	42.33 (2023)	Nuclear (Note: Uprated from 6,408 MWe to 6,610 MWe in November 2022.)	
20	Longtan		China	25°01′38″N 107°02′51″E	6,426	18.7 (estimate)	Hydro	

== Timeline of the largest power plants in the world ==
At all times since the early 20th century, the largest power station in the world has been a hydroelectric power plant.

Held record		Name of power station	Capacity (MW)	Location	Notes
From	To	Name of power station	Capacity (MW)	Location	Notes
1891	1895	Deptford Power Station	0.8	London, United Kingdom	
1895	1904	Edward Dean Adams Power Plant	37	Niagara Falls, New York, United States	
1904	1911	Niagara Power Plant	103	Niagara Falls, New York, United States	
1911	1913	Vemork	108	Rjukan, Telemark, Norway	
1913	1914	Lock and Dam No. 19	142	Hamilton, Illinois / Keokuk, Iowa, United States	
1914	1924	Niagara Power Plant	180.8–337.4	Niagara Falls, New York, USA	
1924	1939	Sir Adam Beck Station I	348.6–498	Niagara Falls, Ontario, Canada	
1939	1949	Hoover Dam	705	Clark County, Nevada / Mohave County, Arizona, United States	
1949	1959	Grand Coulee Dam	2,280	Washington, United States	
1959	1963	Volga Hydroelectric Station	2,300–2,563	Volgograd, Russian SFSR, Soviet Union	
1963	1971	Bratsk Hydroelectric Power Station	2,750–4,500	Bratsk, Russian SFSR, Soviet Union	
1971	1983	Krasnoyarsk Dam	5,000–6,000	Krasnoyarsk, Russian SFSR, Soviet Union	
1983	1986	Grand Coulee Dam	6,181–6,809	Washington, United States	
1986	1989	Guri Dam	10,235	Necuima Canyon, Venezuela	
1989	2007	Itaipu Dam	10,500–14,000	Paraná River, Brazil / Paraguay	
2007	present	Three Gorges Dam	14,100–22,500	Three Gorges, Yichang, Hubei Province, China	

== Non-renewable power stations ==
=== Coal ===
Rank	Station	Image	Country	Location	Capacity (MW)	Ref
1	Guodian Beilun		China	29°56′37″N 121°48′57″E	7,340	
2	Tuoketuo		China	40°11′49″N 111°21′52″E	6,720	
3	Taean		South Korea	36°54′20″N 126°14′05″E	6,100	
4	Dangjin		South Korea	37°03′19″N 126°30′35″E	6,040	
5	Changle		China		6,000	
6	Taichung		Taiwan	24°12′46″N 120°28′52″E	5,500	(uses bituminous coal)
7	Waigaoqiao		China	31°21′21″N 121°35′54″E	5,160	
8	Bełchatów		Poland	51°15′59″N 19°19′50″E	5,102	(uses lignite)
9	Yeongheung		South Korea	37°14′17″N 126°26′09″E	5,080	
10	Guohua Taishan		China	21°52′00″N 112°55′22″E	5,000	
10	Jiaxing		China	30°37′46″N 121°08′49″E	5,000	

=== Fuel oil ===
Rank	Station	Image	Country	Location	Capacity (MW)	Ref
1	Shoaiba		Saudi Arabia	20°40′48″N 39°31′24″E	5,600	
2	Ghazlan		Saudi Arabia	26°51′15″N 49°53′56″E	4,528	
3	Kashima		Japan	35°52′47″N 140°41′22″E	4,400	
4	Anegasaki		Japan	35°29′06″N 140°01′00″E	3,600	
5	Qurayyah		Saudi Arabia	25°50′40″N 50°07′31″E	3,927	
6	Yokohama		Japan	35°28′36″N 139°40′44″E	3,379	
7	Hirono		Japan	37°14′18″N 141°01′04″E	3,200	
8	Sabiya I		Kuwait		2,400	
8	Az Zour South		Kuwait		2,400	
8	Doha West		Kuwait		2,400	

=== Natural gas ===
Rank	Station	Image	Country	Location	Capacity (MW)	Ref
1	Jebel Ali		United Arab Emirates	25°03′35″N 55°07′02″E	8,695	
2	Surgut-2		Russia	61°16′46″N 73°30′45″E	5,687	
3	Futtsu		Japan	35°20′35″N 139°50′02″E	5,040	
4	Tatan		Taiwan	25°01′34″N 121°02′50″E	4,986	
5	Kawagoe		Japan	35°00′25″N 136°41′20″E	4,802	
6	Beni Suef		Egypt		4,800	
6	Burullus		Egypt	31°31′46″N 30°48′32″E	4,800	
6	New Capital		Egypt		4,800	
7	Higashi-Niigata		Japan	37°59′58″N 139°14′29″E	4,780	
8	Chiba		Japan	35°33′57″N 140°06′20″E	4,380	
9	Himeji		Japan	34°46′24″N 134°41′38″E	4,086	
10	Phú Mỹ		Vietnam	10°36′20″N 107°02′12″E	3,900	

=== Nuclear ===
Rank	Station	Image	Country	Location	Capacity (MW)	Ref
−	Kashiwazaki-Kariwa		Japan	37°25′45″N 138°35′43″E	7,965	(out of service since 2011)
1	Kori		South Korea	35°19′40″N 129°18′03″E	7,489	
2	Hanul		South Korea	37°05′34″N 129°23′01″E	7,268	(additional units under construction)
3	Bruce		Canada	44°19′31″N 81°35′58″W	6,610	
4	Hongyanhe		China	39°48′07″N 121°28′30″E	6,366	
5	Fuqing		China	25°26′45″N 119°26′50″E	6,120	
6	Tianwan		China	34°41′13″N 119°27′35″E	6,100	(additional units under construction)
7	Yangjiang		China	21°42′35″N 112°15′38″E	6,000	
8	Hanbit		South Korea	35°24′54″N 126°25′26″E	5,875	
−	Zaporizhzhia		Ukraine	47°30′44″N 34°35′09″E	5,700	(out of service since 2022)

=== Oil shale ===
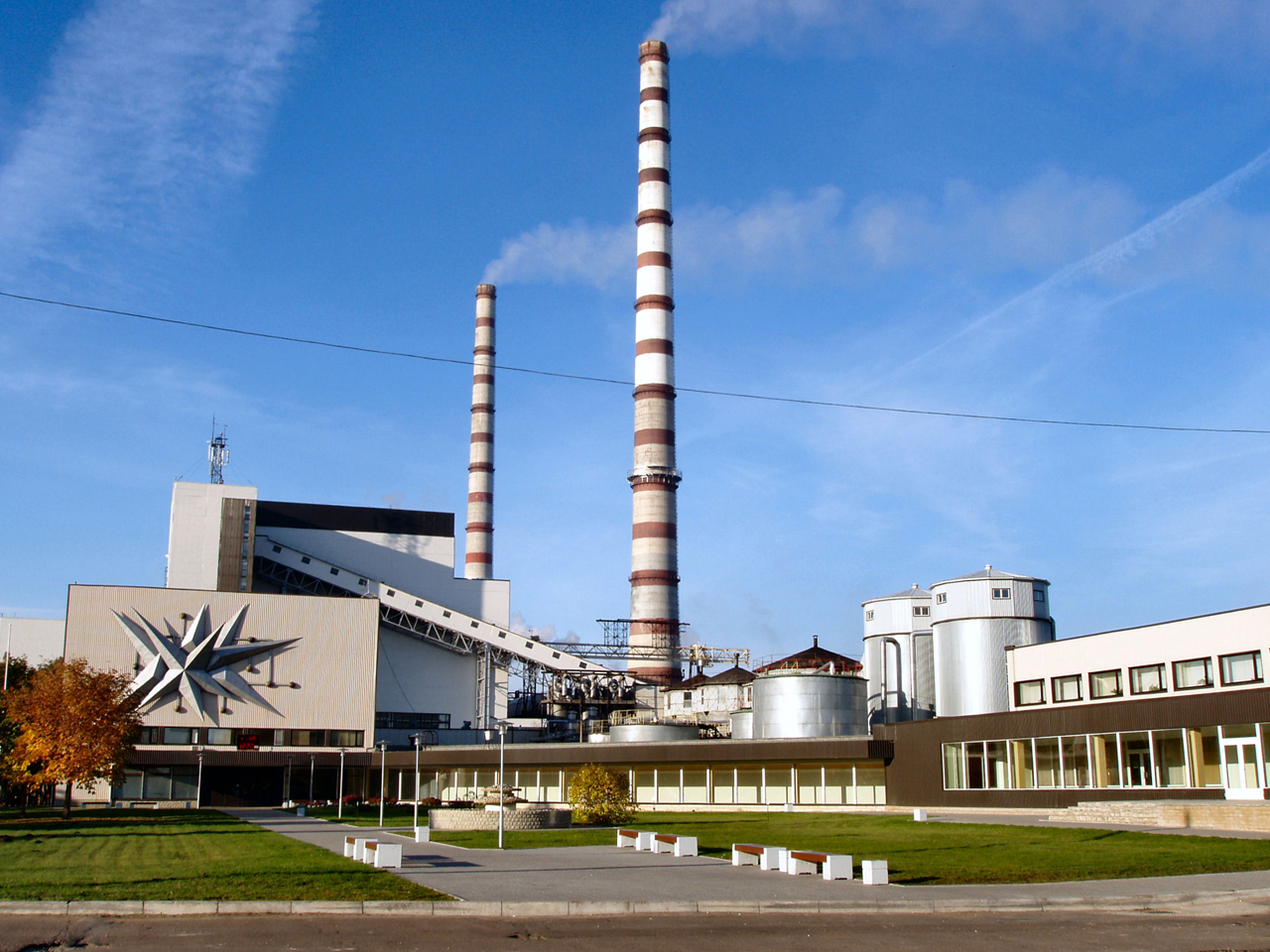
Eesti Power Station, the world's largest oil shale-fired power station

Rank	Station	Country	Location	Capacity (MW)	Ref
1.	Eesti	Estonia	59°16′10″N 27°54′08″E	1,615	
2.	Balti	Estonia	59°21′12″N 28°07′22″E	765	
3.	Auvere	Estonia	59°21′12″N 28°07′22″E	300	
4.	Huadian	China		100	
5.	Kohtla-Järve	Estonia	59°23′45″N 27°14′31″E	39	

=== Peat ===
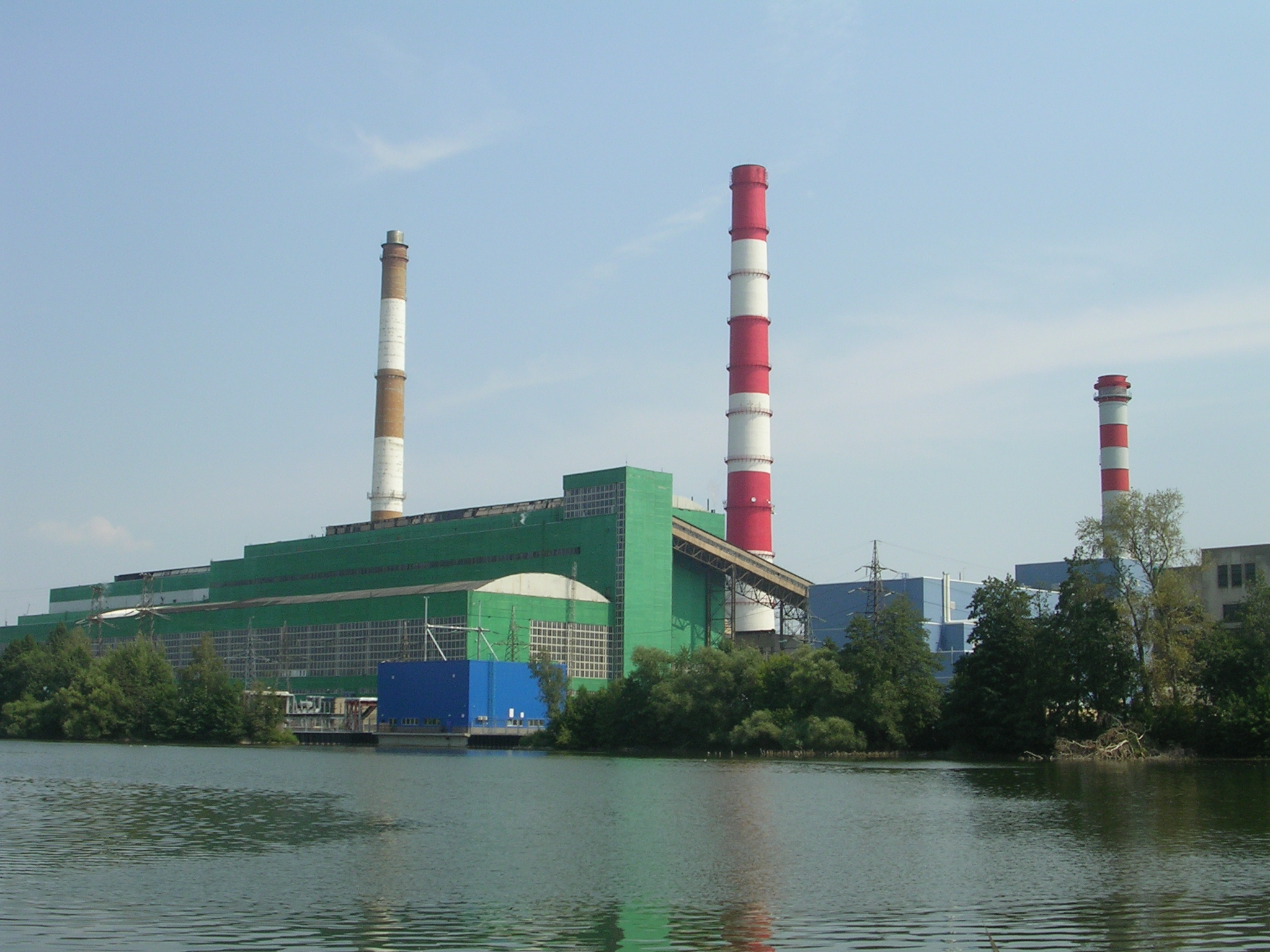
Shatura, largest peat-fired power station at 1,500 MW

Rank	Station	Country	Location	Capacity (MW)	Ref
1.	Shatura	Russia	55°35′00″N 39°33′40″E	1,500	(Note: Natural gas primary fuel (78.0%), peat secondary (11.5%))
2.	Kirov	Russia	58°37′16″N 49°35′47″E	300	
3.	Keljonlahti	Finland	62°11′33″N 25°44′14″E	209	
4.	Toppila	Finland	65°02′15″N 25°26′07″E	190	
5.	Haapavesi	Finland	64°07′19″N 25°24′47″E	154	

== Renewable power stations ==
=== Biomass ===
Station	Country	Geographic coordinate system	Capacity (MW)	Main fuel	Ref
Drax (units 1–4)	UK	53°44′09″N 0°59′47″W	2,595	pellet fuel	
Paso de los Toros Paper Mill	Uruguay	32°51′46″S 56°32′30″W	314	black liquor	
Alholmens Kraft	Finland	63°42′07″N 22°42′35″E	265	forest residue	
Maasvlakte 3	Netherlands	51°54′45″N 4°1′16″E	220	biomass	(Note: installed capacity is 1100 MW with cofiring 80% coal and 20% biomass)
Połaniec	Poland	50°26′14″N 21°20′14″E	225	woodchips	
Atikokan Generating Station	Canada	48°50′17″N 91°34′15″W	205	biomass	
Rodenhuize	Belgium	51°8′4.88″N 3°46′35.94″E	180	wood pellet	
Kymijärvi II	Finland		160	RDF	
Ashdown Paper Mill	United States		157	black liquor	
Wisapower	Finland		150	black liquor	

=== Geothermal ===
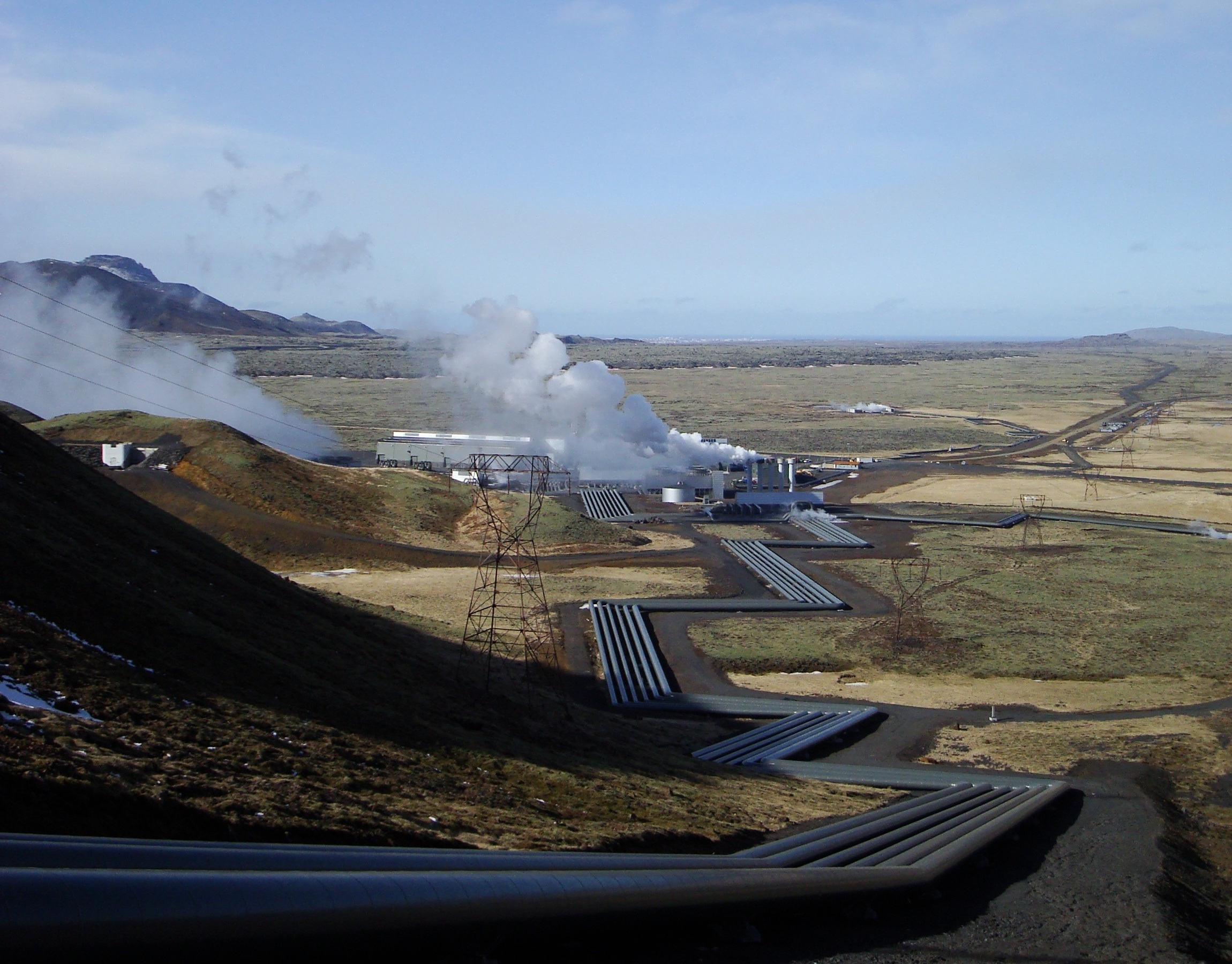
Hellisheiði Power Station, the eighth largest geothermal power station at 303 MWe

Station	Country	Location	Capacity (MW)	Ref
The Geysers	United States	38°47′26″N 122°45′21″W	1,517	
Cerro Prieto	Mexico	32°23′57″N 115°14′19″W	820	
Larderello	Italy	43°13′56″N 10°53′07″E	769	
Olkaria	Kenya	0°53′14″S 36°18′25″E	727	
Imperial Valley	United States	33°09′48″N 115°37′00″W	403.4	
Sarulla	Indonesia	1°53′14″N 99°01′24″E	330	
Tiwi	Philippines	13°27′34″N 123°38′21″E	330	
Hellisheiði	Iceland	64°02′14″N 21°24′03″W	303	
Coso	United States	36°01′00″N 117°47′51″W	270	
Darajat	Indonesia	7°13′05″S 107°43′38″E	255	

=== Hydroelectric ===
==== Conventional ====
Station	Country	Location	Capacity (MW)	Ref
Three Gorges	China	30°49′15″N 111°00′08″E	22,500	
Baihetan Dam	China	27°13′07″N 102°54′22″E	16,000	
Itaipu	Brazil; Paraguay	25°24′31″S 54°35′21″W	14,000	
Xiluodu	China	28°15′52″N 103°38′47″E	13,860	
Belo Monte	Brazil	03°07′27″S 51°42′01″W	11,233	
Guri	Venezuela	07°45′59″N 62°59′57″W	10,235	
Wudongde	China	26°19′29″N 102°38′03″E	10,200	
Tucuruí	Brazil	03°49′53″S 49°38′36″W	8,370	
Xiangjiaba	China	28°38′57″N 104°22′14″E	7,798	
Grand Coulee	United States	47°57′23″N 118°58′56″W	6,809	

==== Run-of-the-river ====
Station	Image	Country	Location	Capacity (MW)	Ref
Jirau		Brazil	9°15′0″S 64°24′0″W	3,750	
Santo Antonio		Brazil	8°48′6″S 63°57′3″W	3,568	
Gezhouba		China	30°44′23″N 111°16′20″E	2,715	
Chief Joseph		United States	47°59′43″N 119°38′00″W	2,620	
John Day		United States	45°52′49″N 120°41′40″W	2,160	

==== Tide ====
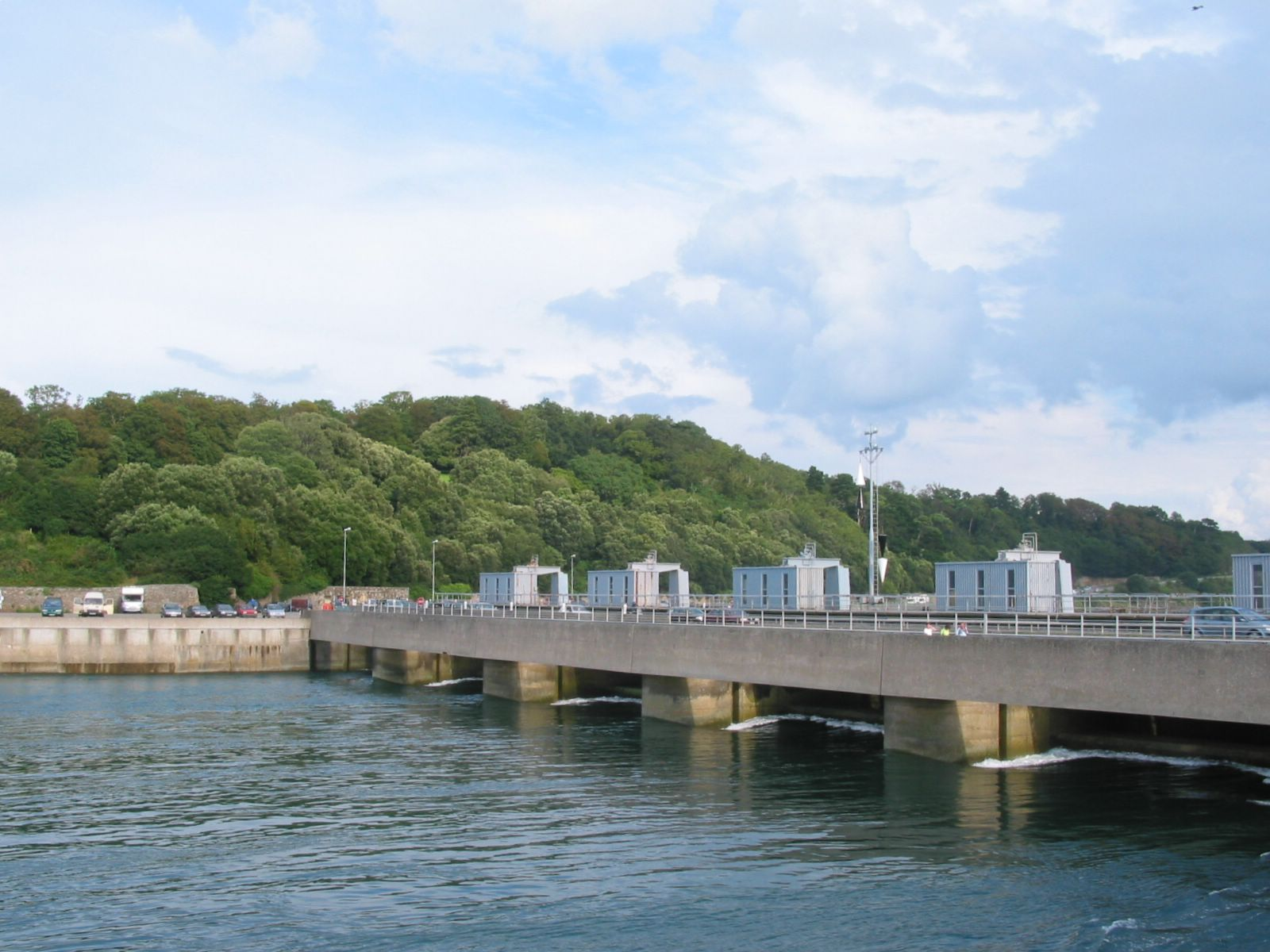
Rance, second largest tidal power station at 240 MW

Rank	Station	Country	Location	Capacity (MW)	Ref
1.	Sihwa Lake	South Korea	37°18′47″N 126°36′46″E	254	
2.	Rance	France	48°37′05″N 02°01′24″W	240	
3.	MeyGen	UK	58°39′30″N 3°7′30″W	6.0	
4.	Jiangxia	China	28°20′34″N 121°14′25″E	3.9	
5.	Kislaya Guba	Russia	69°22′37″N 33°04′34″E	1.7	

=== Solar power ===
==== Photovoltaic ====
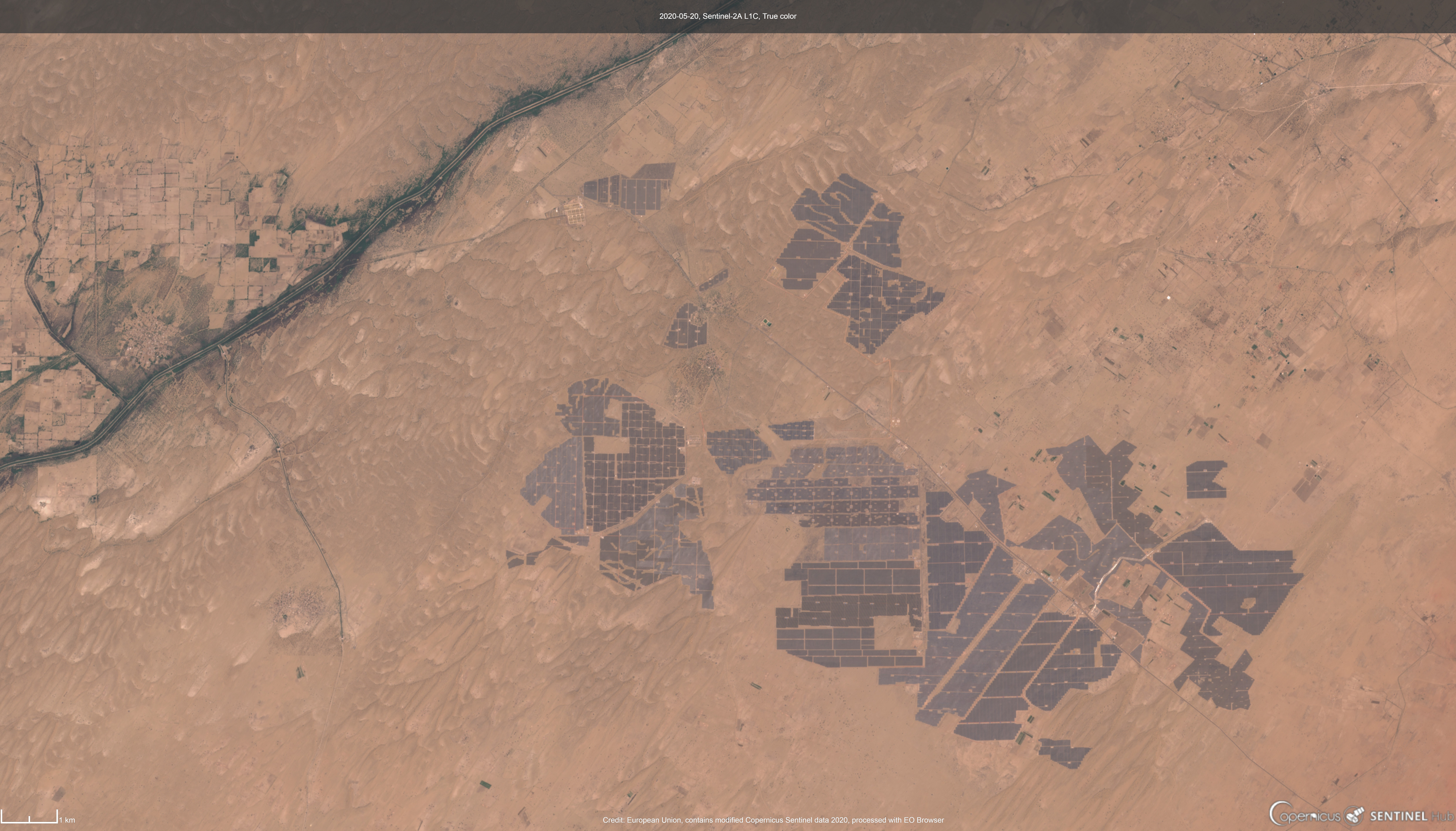
Satellite image of the Bhadla Solar Park in India, one of the world's largest solar parks

Station	Country	Location	Capacity (MW)	Ref
Gonghe Talatan Solar Park	China	36°10′54″N 100°34′41″E	21,000	
Ningdong Solar Park	China	37.97216°N 106.87157°E	18,320	
Hobq Solar Park	China	40.3967°N 108.88052°E; 40.30244°N 109.72149°E	10,020	
Urtmorin Solar Park	China	36.8135°N 93.4281°E	5,440	
Midong Solar Park	China	44.725°N 87.679°E	5,000	
Ruoqiang Solar Park	China	38.9050°N 88.2522°E	4,000	
Lingwu Solar Park	China		4,000	
Otog Front Banner Solar Park	China	38.43564°N 106.88427°E	4,000	
Gelmud East Solar Park	China	36.3711°N 95.1934°E	3,534	
Denlingha Solar Park	China	33.2221°N 97.1239°E	3,350	

==== Concentrated solar thermal ====
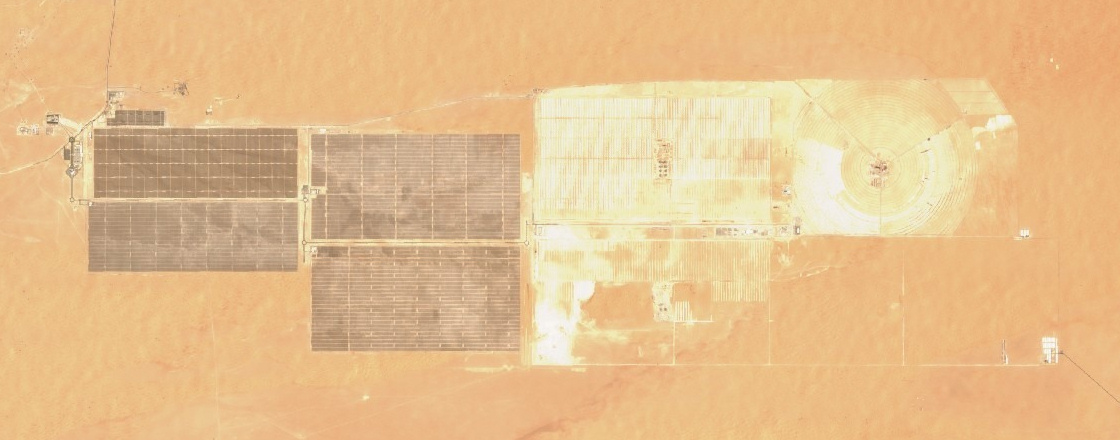
The Mohammed bin Rashid Al Maktoum Solar Park, the largest single-site concentrated solar power plant in the world

Station	Country	Location	Capacity (MW)	Ref
Mohammed bin Rashid Al Maktoum Solar Park Phase IV	United Arab Emirates	24.7547°N 55.365°E	700	
Ouarzazate	Morocco	30°59′40″N 06°51′48″W	510	
Ivanpah	United States	35°34′N 115°28′W	392	
Solana	United States	32°55′N 112°58′W	280	
Genesis	United States	33°38′38″N 114°59′17″W	280	
Mojave Solar Project	United States	35°00′40″N 117°19′30″W	280	
Solaben	Spain	39°13′29″N 5°23′26″W	200	
SEGS	United States	35°01′54″N 117°20′53″W	160	
Solnova	Spain	37°25′00″N 06°17′20″W	150	
Andasol	Spain	37°13′43″N 03°04′07″W	150	

=== Wind ===
==== Onshore ====
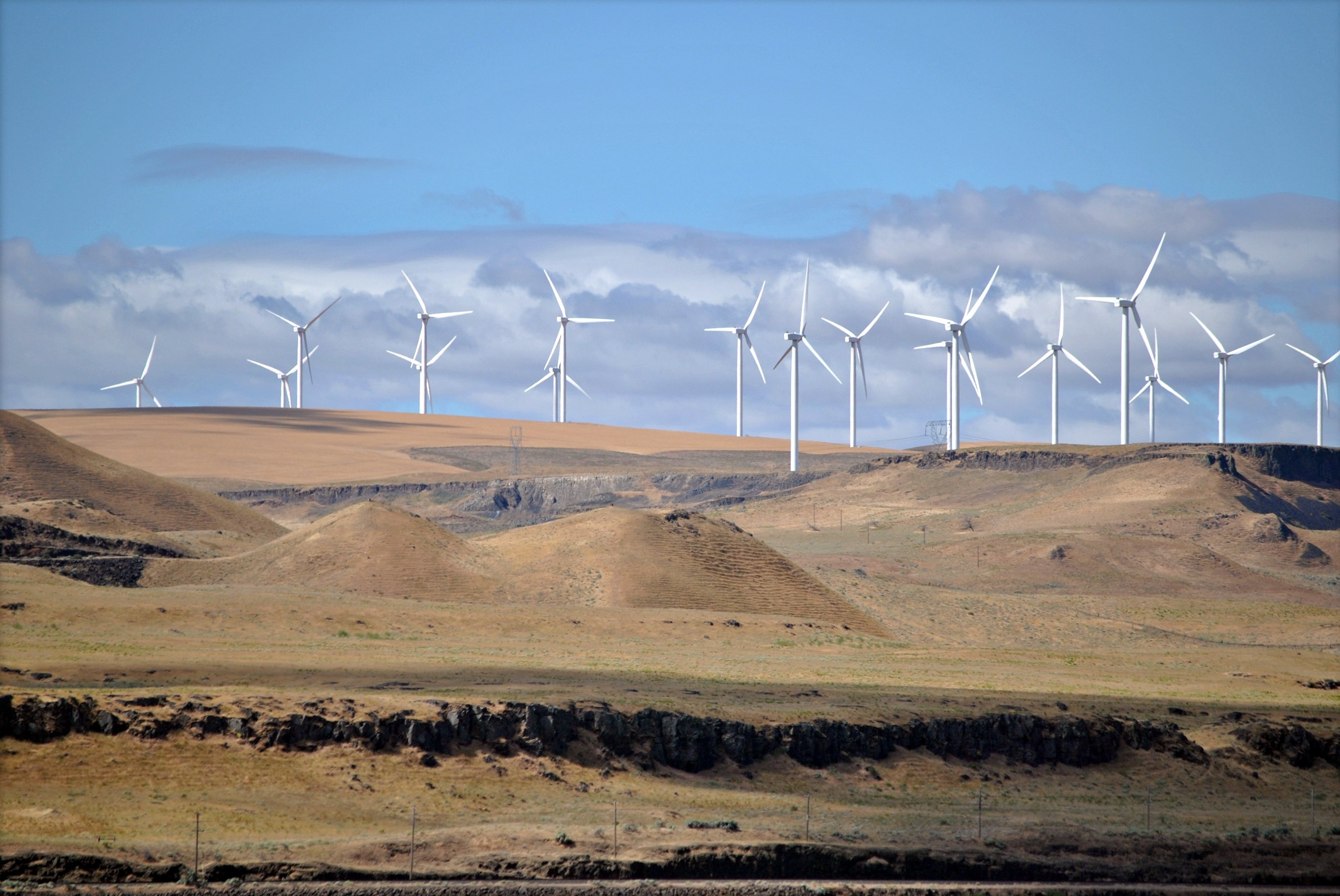
Shepherds Flat Wind Farm, 845 MW

Station	Country	Location	Capacity (MW)	Ref
Gansu	China	40°12′00″N 96°54′00″E	≈10,000 (in 2021)	was 7,965
Markbygden Wind Farm	Sweden	65°25′N 20°40′E	2,000	
Alta	United States	35°1′16″N 118°19′14″W	1,548	
Muppandal Wind Farm	India	8.260706°N 77.538575°E	1,500	
Jaisalmer	India	26°55′12″N 70°54′00″E	1,064	
Fosen Vind	Norway	63°43′0″N 10°15′0″E	1,057	
Western Spirit Wind	United States		1,050	
Great Prairie Wind	United States		1,027	
Traverse Wind Project	United States		998	
Los Vientos Wind Farm	United States	26°19′51″N 97°35′09″W	912	

==== Offshore ====
Station	Country	Location	Capacity (MW)	Ref
Hornsea 2	United Kingdom	53°54′36″N 1°33′06″E	1,386	
Hornsea 1	United Kingdom	53.885°N 1.791°E	1,218	
Seagreen	United Kingdom	56°35′17″N 1°44′28″W	1,075	
Moray East	United Kingdom	58°10′01″N 2°41′55″W	950	
Greater Changhua (1 & 2A)	Taiwan	24.1558°N 119.8694°E	900	
Triton Knoll	United Kingdom	53°24′N 0°54′E	857	
Hollandse Kust Noord	Netherlands	52°42′54″N 4°15′04″E	759	
Borssele I & II	Netherlands	51°42′N 3°05′E	752	
Borssele III & IV	Netherlands	51°42′25″N 2°54′45″E	735.1	
East Anglia ONE	United Kingdom	52°40′N 2°18′E	714	

==== Hydrogen hybrid ====
Community	Country	Wind MW
Ramea, Newfoundland and Labrador	Newfoundland, Canada	0.3
Prince Edward Island Wind-Hydrogen Village	PEI, Canada	
Lolland	Denmark	
Minot	North Dakota, US	
Koluel Kaike	Santa Cruz, Argentina	
Ladymoor Renewable Energy Project (LREP)	Scotland	
Hunterston Hydrogen Project	Scotland	
RES2H2	Greece	0.50
Unst	Scotland	0.03
Utsira	Norway	0.60

== Storage power stations ==
=== Pumped-storage ===
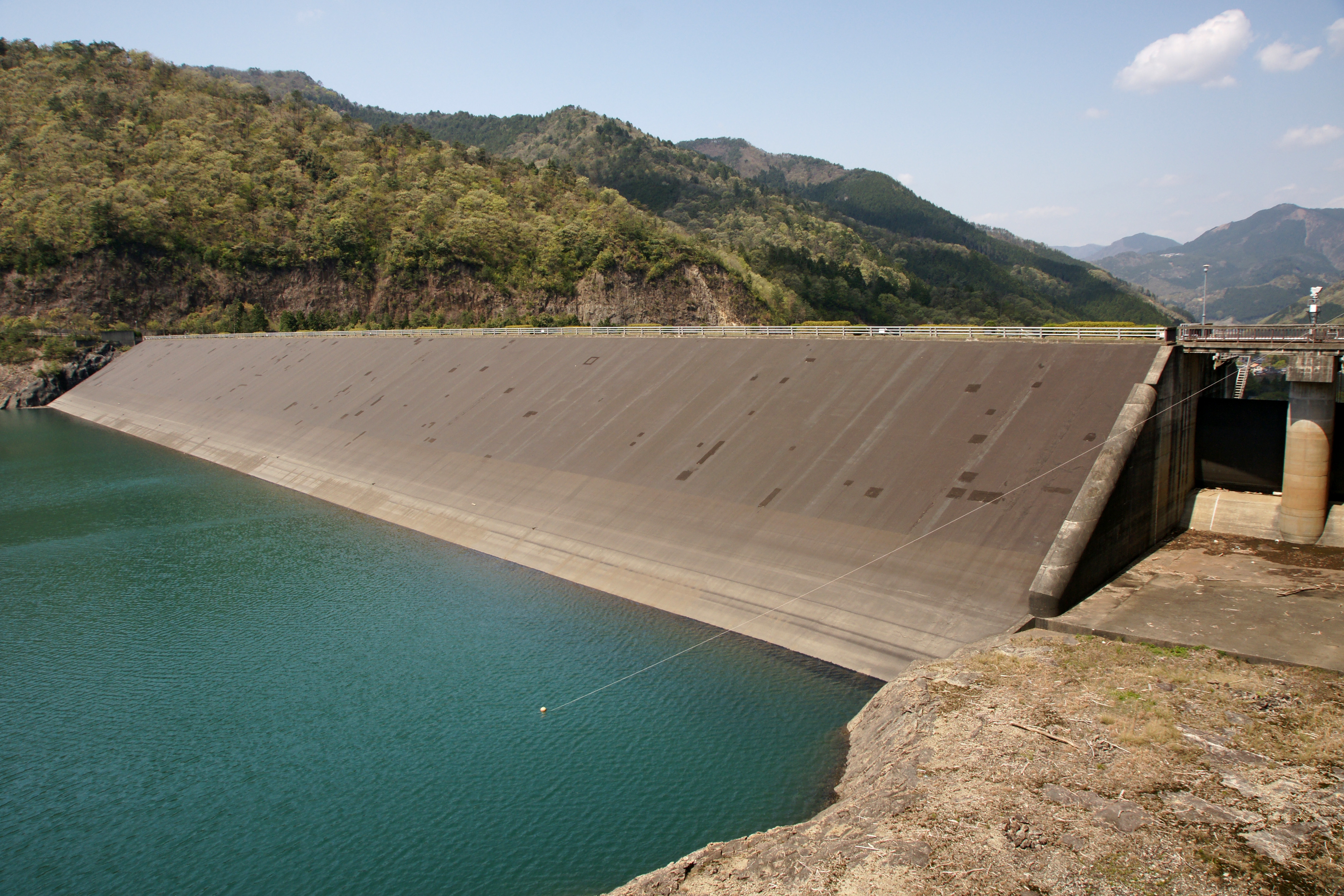
Upper reservoir of Okutataragi Pumped Storage Power Station at 1,932 MW

Rank	Station	Country	Location	Capacity (MW)	Ref
1.	Fengning	China	41°40′34″N 116°32′58″E	3,600	
2.	Bath County	United States	38°12′32″N 79°48′00″W	3,003	
3.	Huizhou	China	23°16′07″N 114°18′50″E	2,448	
4.	Guangdong	China	23°45′52″N 113°57′12″E	2,400	
5.	Ludington	United States	43°53′37″N 86°26′43″W	2,172	

=== Battery storage ===
Rank	Station	Country	Location	Capacity (MW)	Ref
1.	Edwards Sanborn Solar and Energy Storage Project	United States		875	
2.	Moss Landing Energy Storage Facility	United States	36°48′17.54″N 121°46′55.19″W	750	
3.	Manatee Energy Storage Center	United States		409	
4.	Gemini Solar	United States		380	
5.	Desert Peak Energy Storage I	United States		325	
6.	Sunlight Storage II	United States		300	
-	Rodeo Ranch Energy Storage	United States		300	
-	Victorian Big Battery	Australia	38°02′S 144°17′E	300	
9.	Sonoran Solar Energy	United States		260	
10.	DeCordova Energy Storage Facility	United States		260	

=== Molten-salt ===
Name	Station	Country	Coordinates	Capacity (MW)	Ref
1.	Ouarzazate Solar Power Station	Morocco	30°59′40″N 6°51′48″W	510	
2.	Solana Generating Station	US	32°55′N 112°58′W	280	
3.	Andasol solar power station	Spain	37°13′42.70″N 3°4′6.73″W	150	
4.	Extresol Solar Power Station	Spain	38°39′N 6°44′W	150	
5.	Crescent Dunes Solar Energy Project	US	38°14′N 117°22′W	125	

== List of largest power stations and units within each country ==
Largest operating power station and largest single generating unit within each country
Country	Largest facility	Location	Capacity (MW)	Fuel type	Largest unit (name of power station)	Location	Unit capacity (MW)	Fuel type	Refs
Afghanistan	Naghlu	34°38′28″N 69°43′01″E	100	Hydro					
Albania	Koman	42°06′23″N 19°49′37″E	600	Hydro					
Algeria	Hadjret En-Nouss	36°34′36″N 02°04′47″E	1,260	Gas	Skikda	36°52′44″N 06°56′12″E	440	Gas	
Argentina	Yacyretá	27°28′58″S 56°43′30″W	3,100	Hydro	Atucha II – CNAII	32°13′54″S 64°26′38″W	745	Nuclear	
Armenia	Hrazdan	40°33′59″N 44°45′03″E	1,590	Gas/oil					
Australia	Eraring	33°03′44″S 151°31′13″E	2,880	Coal	Kogan Creek	26°54′59″S 150°44′57″E	750	Coal	
Austria	Simmering	48°10′52″N 16°26′06″E	1,700	Gas	Dürnrohr	48°19′32″N 15°55′25″E	405	Coal	
Azerbaijan	Azerbaijan	40°46′49″N 46°59′30″E	2,400	Fuel oil					
Bangladesh	Ashuganj Power Station	24°02′35″N 91°01′06″E	1,569.67	Gas	400 MW CCPP (East)	24°02′35″N 91°01′06″E	400.16	Gas	
Belarus	Lukoml	54°40′51″N 29°08′05″E	2,890	Gas					
Belgium	Tihange	50°32′5″N 5°16′21″E	3,008	Nuclear	Tihange Unit 3	50°32′5″N 5°16′21″E	1,065	Nuclear	
Bhutan	Tala	27°02′09″N 89°35′49″E	1,020	Hydro	Tala	27°02′09″N 89°35′49″E	170	Hydro	
Brazil	Itaipu	25°24′31″S 54°35′21″W	14,000	Hydro	Angra II	23°00′30″S 44°27′26″W	1,350	Nuclear	
Bulgaria	Kozloduy	43°44′46″N 23°46′14″E	2,000	Nuclear					
(Myanmar) Burma	Yeywa	21°41′20″N 96°25′17″E	790	Hydro	Yeywa		197	Hydro	
Canada	Bruce	44°19′31″N 81°35′58″W	6,610	Nuclear	Darlington	43°52′09″N 78°43′27″W	878	Nuclear	
Chile	Ventanas	32°45′04″S 71°28′57″W	875	Coal	Atacama		370	Gas	
China	Three Gorges	30°49′15″N 111°00′08″E	22,500	Hydro	Taishan	21°55′04″N 112°58′55″E	1,660	Nuclear	
Colombia	Hidroituango	7°08′04″N 75°39′43″W	2,456	Hydro					
Costa Rica	Limón	10°3′56″N 84°34′48″W	306	Hydro					
Croatia	HE Zakučac	43°27′26″N 15°42′8″E	538	Hydro	HE Zakučac A, B, C, D		134.5	Hydro	
Czech Republic	Temelín	49°10′48″N 14°22′34″E	2,030	Nuclear	Temelín		1,015	Nuclear	
(Democratic Republic of the Congo) DR Congo	Inga II	5°31′36″S 13°37′14″E	1,424	Hydro					
Denmark	Asnæs	55°39′41″N 11°05′04″E	1,057	Coal					
Egypt	Burullus Power Plant	31°31′46″N 30°48′32″E	4,800	Gas					
Estonia	Eesti Power Plant	59.269565°N 27.902184°E	1,615	Oil shale					
Ethiopia	GERD	11°12′55″N 35°05′35″E	5,150	Hydro					
Finland	Olkiluoto	61°14′13″N 21°26′27″E	3,380	Nuclear	Olkiluoto Unit 3	61°14′13″N 21°26′27″E	1,600	Nuclear	
France	Gravelines	51°00′55″N 02°08′10″E	5,460	Nuclear	Flamanville Unit 3	49°32′11″N 01°52′54″W	1,600	Nuclear	
Germany	Boxberg	51°24′58″N 14°33′53″E	2,575	Coal					
Ghana	Akosombo	6°17′59″N 00°03′34″E	1,020	Hydro					
Greece	Agios Dimitrios Power Plant	40.393757°N 21.925106°E	1,585	Coal	Unit V		365	Lignite	
Hungary	Paks	46°34′21″N 18°51′15″E	1,889	Nuclear	Paks	46°34′21″N 18°51′15″E	473	Nuclear	
Iceland	Kárahnjúkavirkjun	64°56′N 15°48′W	690	Hydro					
India	Vindhyachal	24°05′53″N 82°40′18″E	4,760	Coal	Kudankulam	08°10′03″N 77°42′46″E	917	Nuclear	
Indonesia	Paiton		4,710	Coal	Paiton		800	Coal	
Iran	Damavand		2,868	Gas					
Iraq	Al-Shemal		2,100	Fuel oil					
Israel	Orot Rabin	32°28′12″N 34°53′16″E	2,590	Coal	Rutenberg	31°37′48″N 34°31′18″E	575	Coal	
Italy	Alessandro Volta	42°21′33″N 11°31′47″E	3,600	Gas				Fuel oil, gas	
Jamaica	South Jamaica Power Centre	17.9004°N 77.1082°W	192	Gas					
Japan	Kashiwazaki-Kariwa	37°25′45″N 138°35′43″E	7,965	Nuclear	Hekinan Power Station	34°50′07″N 136°57′39″E	1,000	Coal	
Kenya	Gitaru	00°47′48″S 37°44′50″E	225	Hydro					
Kyrgyzstan	Toktogul	41°39′25″N 72°38′9″E	1,260	Hydro	Toktogul	41°39′25″N 72°38′9″E	360	Hydro	
Latvia	Pļaviņas	56°35′00″N 25°14′30″E	883	Hydro					
Lebanon	Zouk	33°58′12″N 35°36′14″E	607	Fuel oil	Zouk 4	33°58′12″N 35°36′14″E	172	Fuel oil	
Lithuania	Elektrėnai	54°46′15″N 24°38′46″E	1,800	Gas					
Malaysia	Sultan Salahuddin Abdul Aziz	03°07′01″N 101°19′19″E	2,420	Gas	Tuanku Jaafar	02°31′59″N 101°47′28″E	750	Gas	
Mexico	Manuel Moreno Torres	16°56′30″N 93°06′02″W	2,430	Hydro	Laguna Verde		665	Nuclear	
Morocco	Jorf Lasfar	33°06′17″N 08°38′12″W	1,356	Coal					
Mozambique	Cahora Bassa	15°35′09″S 32°42′17″E	2,075	Hydro					
Nepal	Upper Tamakoshi Hydroelectric Project	27°50′38″N 86°13′05″E	456	Hydro	Upper Tamakoshi Hydroelectric Project		76	Hydro	
Netherlands	Claus	51°09′21″N 05°54′25″E	1,900	Gas					
New Zealand	Huntly	37°32′38″S 175°9′10″E	950	Coal/gas	Huntly Unit 5	37°32′38″S 175°9′10″E	400	Gas	
Nigeria	Egbin	06°33′48″N 03°36′55″E	1,320	Gas					
North Macedonia	Bitola	41°03′29″N 21°29′00″E	675	Coal					
Norway	Kvilldal		1,240	Hydro					
Pakistan	Tarbela	34°05′23″N 72°41′54″E	4,888	Hydro					
Panama	Enel Fortuna		300	Hydro					
Paraguay	Itaipu	25°24′31″S 54°35′21″W	14,000	Hydro					
Peru	Mantaro-Tablachaca Hydroelectric Complex^{(Spanish)}	12°17′28″S 74°41′04″W	1,008	Hydro	Ventanilla		185	Gas	
Philippines	Sual Power Station	13°46′13″N 121°02′06″E	1,500	Gas	Sual Power Station	16°07′27″N 120°06′04″E	647	Coal	
Poland	Bełchatów	51°15′59″N 19°19′50″E	5,102	Coal	Bełchatów	51°15′59″N 19°19′50″E	858	Coal	
Portugal	Pego	39°28′5″N 8°6′33″W	1,473	Coal, natural gas	Sines	37°55′57″N 8°48′14″W	1,180	Coal	
Qatar	Ras Qartas	25°56′13″N 51°31′20″E	2,730	Gas					
Romania	Turceni	44°40′11″N 23°24′28″E	2,640	Coal	Cernavodă Nuclear Power Plant		706	Nuclear	
Russia	Sayano-Shushenskaya	54°49′33″N 91°22′13″E	6,400	Hydro	Kostroma Power Station	57°27′22″N 41°10′20″E	1,200	Gas	
Rwanda	Nyabarongo	1°59′19.4″S 29°37′59.3″E	28	Hydro					
Saudi Arabia	Shoaiba	20°40′48″N 139°31′24″E	5,600	Fuel oil			730		
Serbia	TPP Nikola Tesla	TENT-A: 44°40′11.5″N 20°09′35.5″E	3,286	Coal	TENT B1/B2	44°39′14.4″N 20°00′20.8″E	620	Coal	
Singapore	Tuas	01°17′20″N 103°38′29″E	1,470	Gas	Tuas	01°17′20″N 103°38′29″E	600	Oil	
Slovenia	Krško Nuclear Power Plant	45.9382023°N 15.5154258°E	696	Nuclear					
South Africa	Kusile	23°42′00″S 27°33′00″E	4,800	Coal	Koeberg		930	Nuclear	
South Korea	Kori	35°15′13″N 129°17′40″E	7,411	Nuclear					
Spain	Almaraz	39°48′29″N 05°41′49″W	2,017	Nuclear	Almaraz	39°48′29″N 05°41′49″W	1,011	Nuclear	
Sri Lanka	Lakvijaya	08°01′06″N 79°43′22″E	900	Coal	Lakvijaya	08°01′06″N 79°43′22″E	300	Coal	
Sudan	Roseires	11°47′56″N 34°23′17″E	1,800	Hydro					
Suriname	Afobaka	4°58′56″N 54°59′32″W	180	Hydro					
Sweden	Forsmark	60°24′12″N 18°10′00″E	3,333	Nuclear	Oskarshamn	57°24′56″N 16°40′16″E	1,400	Nuclear	
Switzerland	Bieudron	46°11′07″N 07°14′58″E	1,269	Hydro	Leibstadt Nuclear Power Plant	47°36′11″N 08°11′05″E	1,220	Nuclear	
Taiwan	Taichung	24°12′46″N 120°28′52″E	5,832	Coal	Kuosheng	25°12′10″N 121°39′45″E	985	Nuclear	
Tanzania	Kidatu	07°38′24″S 36°52′59″E	204	Hydro					
Thailand	Mae Moh	18°17′45″N 99°45′07″E	2,180	Coal					
Turkey	Atatürk	37°28′58″N 38°19′14″E	2,400	Hydro					
Uganda	Bujagali Power Station	27°50′38″N 86°13′05″E	250	Hydro					
Ukraine	Zaporizhzhia	47°30′44″N 35°35′09″E	5,700	Nuclear					
United Kingdom	Drax	53°44′09″N 00°59′47″W	2,595	Biomass (formerly coal)					
United States	Grand Coulee	47°57′23″N 118°58′56″W	6,809	Hydro	Grand Gulf	32°0′26″N 91°2′52″W	1,401	Nuclear	
Uruguay	Salto Grande	31°16′31″S 57°56′18″W	1,890	Hydro					
Venezuela	Guri	07°45′59″N 62°59′57″W	10,235	Hydro					
Vietnam	Sơn La	21°29′47″N 103°59′42″E	2,400	Hydro	Nhon Trach-2		760	Gas	
Zambia	Kariba	15°48′30″S 28°25′15″E	960	Hydro					
Zimbabwe	Hwange	18°23′0″S 26°28′12″E	920	Coal					

== See also ==
- Power station
- Lists of power stations
