= Rabigh 2 IPP =

Combined-cycle power plant in Saudi Arabia

- Country: Saudi Arabia
- Location: Rabigh, Makkah Province
- Coordinates: 22°37′45″N 39°02′47″E
- Status: Under construction
- Construction began: December 25, 2013
- Commission date: June 25, 2017
- Construction cost: $1,200 million
- Owner: Al Mourjan For Electricity Production Company
- Operator: NOMAC

Thermal power station
- Primary fuel: Natural gas
- Secondary fuel: Arabian Super Light
- Combined cycle?: Yes

Power generation
- Units under const.: 6 Siemens CTGs; 3 Siemens STGs; 6 HRSGs
- Nameplate capacity: 2,060 MW

Rabigh 2 IPP (R2IPP) is a combined cycle power station project under construction on the western coast of Saudi Arabia, 150 km (93 mi) north of Jeddah. R2IPP will have an installed electrical generating capacity of 2,060 megawatts to supply Makkah Province with electric power. The project will deliver electricity to Saudi Electricity Company under the power purchase agreement which has a term of 20 years from the scheduled commercial operations date of June 2020.

== Technology ==
The project will utilize natural gas as main fuel and Arabian Super Light (ASL) as backup fuel and with the application of combined cycle power station in a configuration of three blocks, each composed of two gas turbines of enhanced efficiency, two heat recovery steam generators and one triple pressure steam turbine which will substantially reduce the fuel consumption, the impact on sea water temperatures and carbon emissions to the environment. R2IPP comprises 4 identical power blocks, each delivering a net output of 686.5 MW. For each of these units, Siemens is delivering two model SGT6-5000F gas turbines, one model SST6-5000 HI-L steam turbine, and three SGen6-1000A-series electric generators. It will be the first independent power producer with a gross thermal efficiency of 58.8% at reference site conditions.

== Shareholders ==
The shareholder structure of Al Mourjan For Electricity Production Company is as follows:

- ACWA Power
- Samsung C&T Corporation
- Saudi Electricity Company

== EPC contractor ==
Samsung C&T Corporation has been appointed as EPC contractor.

== Milestone dates ==
Contract Signing: December 25, 2013
Completion: June 25, 2020

== See also ==
- Qurayyah IPP
- Shuqaiq 2 IWPP
- List of largest power stations in the world
- List of power stations in Saudi Arabia
