= Sipring Khola Hydropower Station =

- Location within Nepal
- Official name: सिप्रिन खोला जलविद्युत आयोजना
- Country: Nepal
- Location: Dolakha District
- Coordinates: 27°48′38″N 86°15′18″E
- Purpose: Power
- Status: Operational
- Owner: Synergy Power Development P Ltd

Dam and spillways
- Type of dam: Gravity
- Impounds: Sipring River

Power Station
- Commission date: 2069-10-03 BS
- Type: Run-of-the-river
- Turbines: Pelton
- Installed capacity: 2 x 5 MW

Sipring Khola Hydropower Station (Nepali: सिप्रिन खोला जलविद्युत आयोजना) is a run-of-river hydro-electric plant located in Dolakha District of Nepal. The flow from Sipring River, a tributary of Tamakoshi River, is used to generate 10 MW electricity. The design head is 443.7 m and the design flow is 2.61m3/s.

The plant is owned and developed by Synergy Power Development P Ltd, an IPP of Nepal. It started generating electricity from 2069-10-03 BS. The generation licence will expire in 2101-01-29 BS, after which the plant will be handed over to the government. The power station is connected to the national grid and the electricity is sold to Nepal Electricity Authority.

== See also ==
- Upper Tamakoshi Hydroelectric Project (456 MW station nearby)
- List of power stations in Nepal
