= Shuqaiq 2 IWPP =

- Country: Saudi Arabia
- Location: Shuqaiq, Jizan
- Coordinates: 17°39′36″N 42°04′34″E
- Status: Operational
- Construction began: February 28, 2007
- Commission date: December 1, 2010
- Construction cost: $1,830 million
- Owners: Shuqaiq Water and Electricity Company
- Operator: NOMAC

Thermal power station
- Primary fuel: Arabian Heavy Crude Oil
- IWPP?: Yes

Power generation
- Units operational: 3 MHI STG; 3 MHI Boiler; 16 MHI RO Trains
- Nameplate capacity: 850 MW

External links
- Website: www.sqwec.com

Shuqaiq 2 IWPP (Independent Water and Power Project) is an integrated water and power plant project in Shuqaiq, Saudi Arabia. Construction of Shuqaiq 2 IWPP began in 2007 and achieved commercial operation in 2010. The project's power and desalination units are located adjacent to the existing Shuqaiq 1 power and desalination complex, 105 km south of Abha and 140 km north of Jizan, on the south-western (Red Sea) coast of Saudi Arabia.

The electricity and water produced at the plant is supplying power to southern grid and water to Abha, Jizan and other southern cities. The plant is currently on full production.

The Project is based on BOO (Build Own Operate) basis, under a 20-year PWPA (Power and Water Purchase Agreement) for the design, construction, commissioning, testing, ownership, operation and maintenance of a new 850 MW Arabian Heavy Crude Oil fired power and 216,000 m^{3}/day (48 MIGD) desalination plant and associated facilities.

== Shareholders ==
The plant is owned by SqWEC (Shuqaiq Water & Electricity Company) and shareholders are:

- ACWA Power: 40%
- Public Investment Fund: 32%
- Gulf Investment Council: 20%
- Saudi Electricity Company: 8%

== Project schedule ==
| Milestone | Date |
|---|---|
| Signature of Agreements LLA, PWPA, EPC and O&M | 28-Feb-2007 |
| Financial Close | 27-Mar-2007 |
| ICOD | 01-May-2010 |
| PCOD | 01-Dec-2010 |

- LLA: Land Lease Agreement
- PWPA: Power and Water Purchase Agreement
- EPC: Engineering, Procurement, Construction
- O&M: Operations and Maintenance
- ICOD: Initial Commercial Operation Date
- PCOD: Project Commercial Operation Date

== Plant configuration ==
The Shuqaiq 2 IWPP comprises three (3) units of Arabian heavy crude oil fired boilers, (3) condensing steam turbines and one reverse osmosis water unit comprising 16 trains. The construction of power and desalination plant was carried out by MHI (Mitsubishi Heavy Industries).

Electricity is fed to the National Grid, SA via a 380kV GIS Substation, which was constructed by Areva, now Alstom.

== See also ==
- Qurayyah IPP
- Rabigh 2 IPP
- List of largest power stations in the world
- List of power stations in Saudi Arabia
