= Jebel Ali Power and Desalination Plant =

CCGT plant in the United Arab Emirates

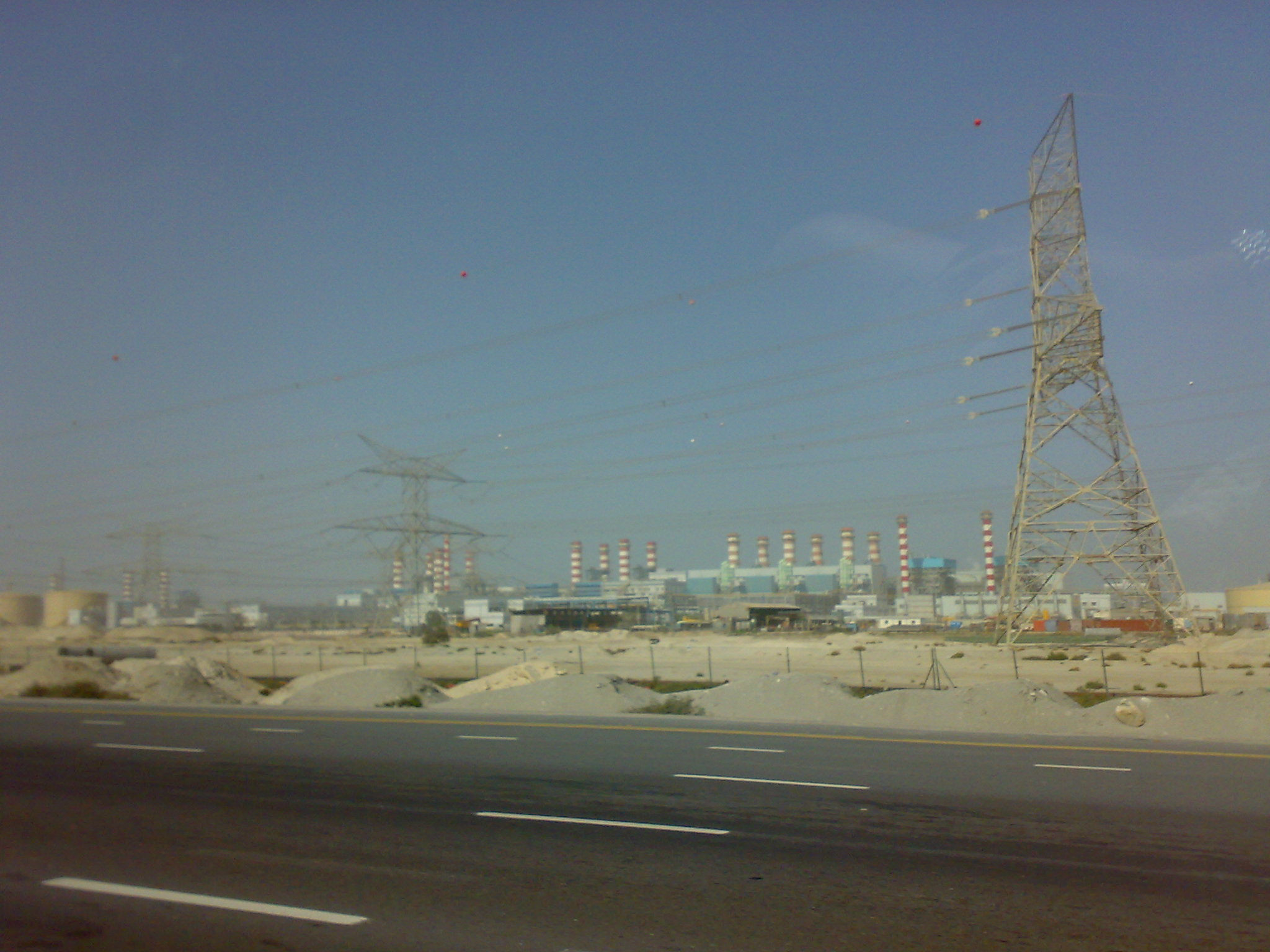
- Some smoke stacks of the power plant
- Official name: Arabic: محطة جبل على
- Country: United Arab Emirates
- Location: Jebel Ali, Emirate of Dubai
- Coordinates: 25°3′35″N 55°7′2″E
- Status: Operational
- Commission date: 1976-2019
- Owner: Dubai Electricity and Water Authority
- Operator: Dubai Electricity and Water Authority

Thermal power station
- Primary fuel: Natural gas, associated petroleum gas
- IWPP?: Yes

Power generation
- Nameplate capacity: 8,694.1 MW

The Jebel Ali Power and Desalination Plant (Arabic: محطة جبل على) is a gas- and oil powered CCGT plant combined with a desalination plant southwest of Dubai in the United Arab Emirates.

The power plant complex, consisting of nine individual plants, extends over a length of more than three kilometers along the coast of the Persian Gulf between the port of Jebel Ali and the Jumeirah district. On the water side, the power plant is located between the artificial islands of Palm Jumeirah and Palm Jebel Ali, approximately 20 km southwest of downtown Dubai.

The facility, which is operated by Dubai's Electricity and Water Authority, covers most of Dubai's energy and water consumption. With an installed capacity of 8.6 gigawatts, it is the world's largest gas-fired power plant. Also the world's largest seawater desalination plant, it can desalinate 2.228 million m^{3} of seawater per day, which corresponds to 490 million imperial gallons per day (MIGD).

The primary fuel used is natural gas or associated gas from oil production; diesel and heating oil are used as back-up. Since Dubai's own oil and gas production is insufficient, fuel is imported via pipelines from neighboring emirates (especially Abu Dhabi and Sharjah) and other countries bordering the Persian Gulf (especially Iran and Qatar).

With one exception, the seawater desalination plants work according to the multi-stage flash distillation process, i.e. they use the waste heat from the power plant. Only one system uses the reverse osmosis process.

== Future plans ==
Future plans include the integration of renewable energy sources such as solar and wind power to further reduce the plant's carbon footprint and reliance on fossil fuels.

== See also ==
- List of largest power stations
- List of power stations in the United Arab Emirates
