= Gansu Wind Farm =

Group of several wind farms in central China

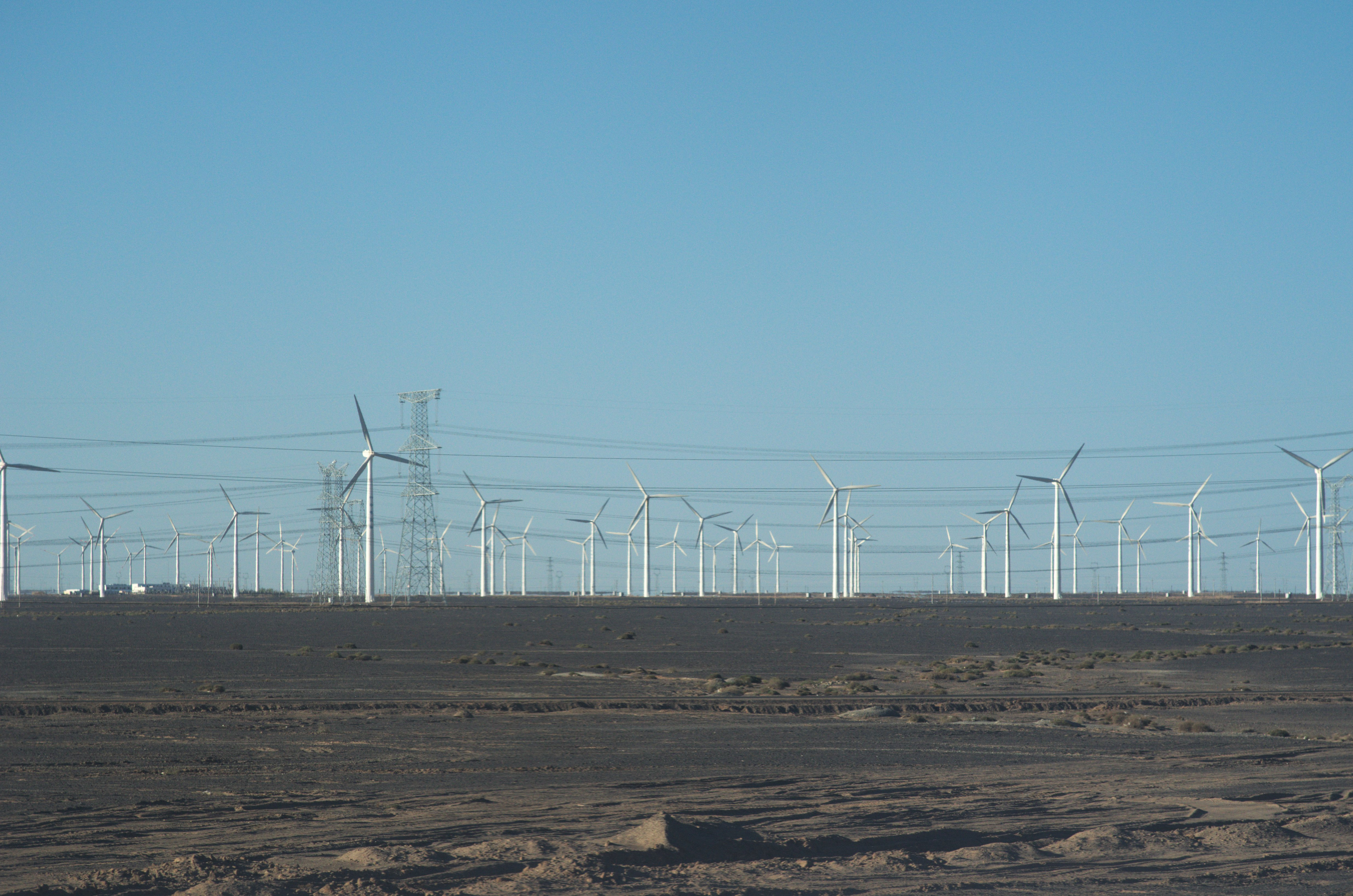
- Country: China
- Location: Gansu
- Coordinates: 40°12′N 96°54′E; 40.2°N 96.9°E; 40.6°N 96.9°E; 40.23°N 97.13°E
- Status: Operational
- Construction began: 2009
- Owner: Multiple

Wind farm
- Type: Onshore

Power generation
- Nameplate capacity: 10.45 GW; Planned: 20 GW

External links
- Commons: Related media on Commons

Gansu Wind Farm
- Simplified Chinese: 甘肃酒泉风电基地
- Traditional Chinese: 甘肅酒泉風電基地
Transcriptions
Standard Mandarin
- Hanyu Pinyin: Gānsù Jiǔquán fēngdiàn jīdì

The Gansu Wind Farm Project or Jiuquan Wind Power Base is a group of large wind farms under construction in western Gansu province in China. The Gansu Wind Farm Project is located in desert areas near the city of Jiuquan in two localities of Guazhou County and also near Yumen City, in the northwest province of Gansu, which has an abundance of wind.

The complex had low levels of utilisation for several years after initial construction, and a ban on further expansion imposed a four year delay while transmission capacity was expanded. Utilization reached 95% in 2020, and the government granted approval to complete the latest phase of construction which brought total generation capacity up to 10GW.

== Overview ==
The project is one of six national wind power megaprojects approved by the Chinese government. It is expected to grow to 20 gigawatts by 2020, at an estimated cost of 120 billion Chinese yuan ($17.5 billion). The project is being built by more than 20 developers in two localities in Guazhou County and also near Yumen City.

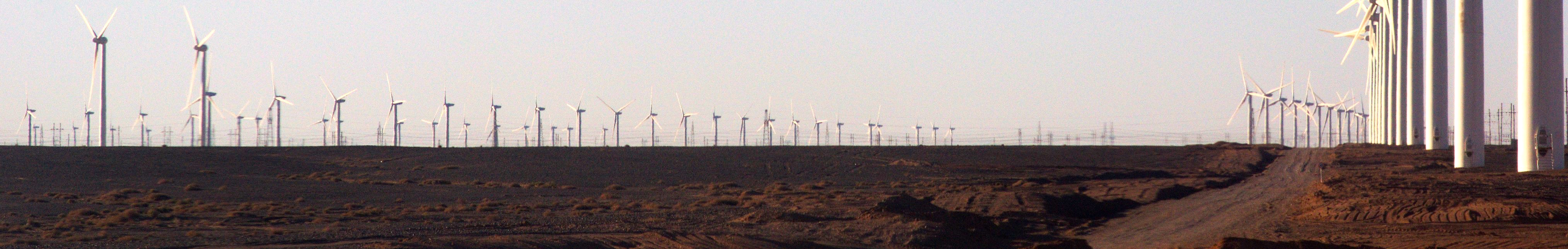
A small part of the huge Gansu wind turbine farm

== Construction phases ==
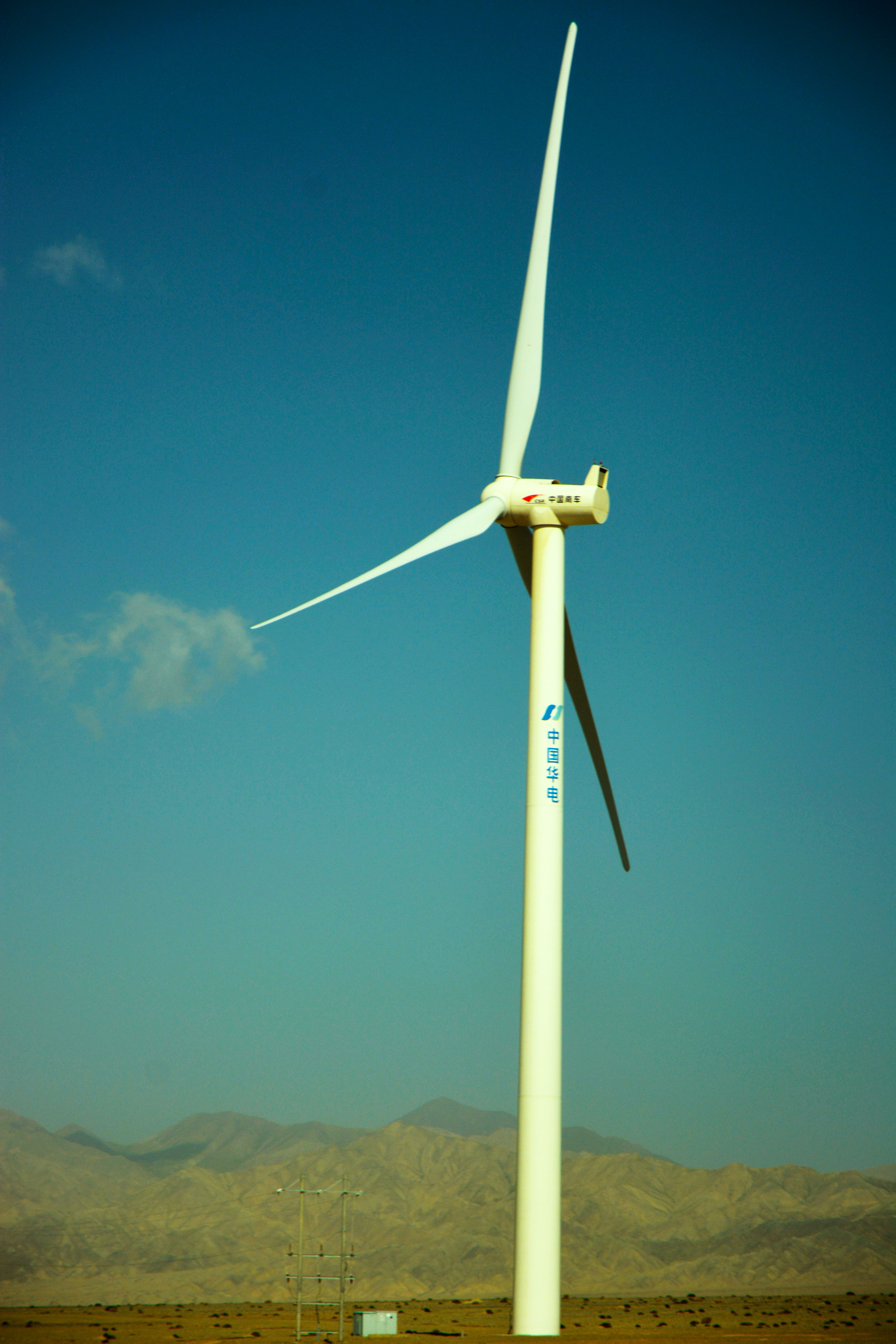
A wind turbine in the wind farm

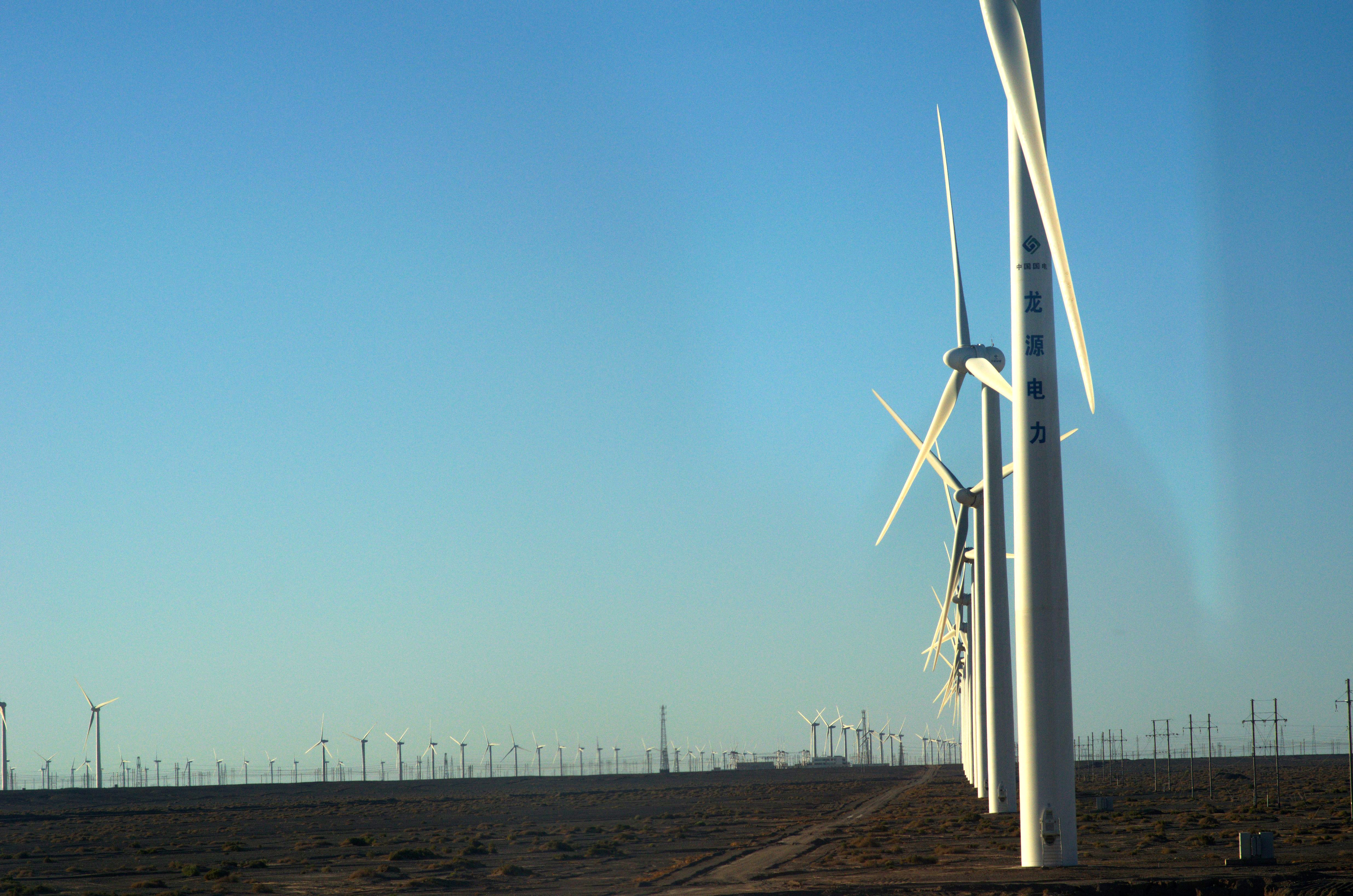
Gansu Wind Farm

The project is divided into multiple phases. The first 3,800 MW phase consisted of eighteen 200 MW wind farms and two 100 MW wind farms. The second 8,000 MW phase consists of forty 200 MW wind farms. The planned capacity was 5,160 MW by 2010, 12,710 MW by 2015 and 20,000 MW in 2020.

In 2008, construction began on a 750 kV AC power line to carry electricity from the wind farm, and construction of the wind farms themselves started in August 2009. Power in 2012 was being purchased for 0.54 yuan per kWh, compared with electricity from coal fired powerplants at 0.3 yuan per kWh. Since operations began, some 6.26 billion kWh has been generated as of October 31, 2011 with 5.96 billion kWh of that produced in 2011.

In November 2010 officials announced the completion of the project's first phase, involving the installation of over 3,500 wind turbines with an installed capacity of approximately 5,160 MW according to Wang Jianxin, director of the Jiuquan Development and Reform Commission.

== Coordinated control centre ==
On March 1, 2012, a "wind power coordinated control system" was implemented to adjust the output of the 18 wind farms of the Gansu Wind Farm Project, which total 10 GW, to meet the needs of the transmission grid, which is limited to 1.5 GW. This permitted the production of 1 GWh more per day than previously, and greatly improves the system's stability.

Curtailment of wind turbine operations is a first order method for dealing with the intermittency of wind, but normally loses available output when the power grid's transmission capacity has been reached. Other methods involve either added local industrial usage or added local storage capacity.

== Demand and utilization ==
The wind farm had low levels of capacity utilisation for several years after construction, as Gansu's distance from major cities, local-government favoritism toward coal and inadequate long-distance transmission capacity meant the province had "some of the highest rates of underutilization in the wind sector in China". National Energy Administration statistics showed 39 percent of wind capacity in 2015 in Jiuquan was unused.

The Gansu wind farm sits along the Gobi Desert where there are extremely high winds providing high wind power generation potential. However, this location is about a thousand miles from China's high density port cities that are typically the biggest consumers of electricity. The central government imposed a strict block on the province expanding generation due to utilisation concerns, and the province built several high-voltage transmission lines to send the electricity generated to other provinces.

In 2017 the 2,383 km long Jiuquan - Hunan HVDC transmission line entered service connecting the remote complex to the Hunan regional grid, allowing greater utilization of its generation capacity. By 2020 the use efficiency of the wind farm had reached 95%, and the central government withdrew its ban on wind energy investment in the province.

== See also ==
- List of largest power stations
- List of onshore wind farms
- List of power stations in China
- Megaproject
- Wind power in China
