= Tuoketuo Power Station =

Coal-fired power station in Inner Mongolia, China

- Official name: 托克托电厂
- Country: China
- Location: Togtoh County, Hohhot, Inner Mongolia
- Coordinates: 40°11′49″N 111°21′52″E
- Status: Operational
- Commission date: November 1995
- Owner: Tuoketuo Power Company

Thermal power station
- Primary fuel: Coal

Power generation
- Units operational: 8 × 600 MW; 2 × 300 MW; 2 × 660 MW
- Nameplate capacity: 6,720 MW
- Annual net output: 33.317 TWh

The Tuoketuo Power Station (Chinese: 托克托电厂; pinyin: Tuōkètuō Diànchǎng) is the largest coal-fired power station in the world. The plant is located in Togtoh County, Hohhot, Inner Mongolia, China. The plant is estimated to have been one of the ten most carbon emitting coal-fired power plants in the world in 2018, at 29.46 million tons of carbon dioxide, and relative emissions are estimated at 1.45 kg per kWh. The plant was commissioned in November 1995 by the Tuoketuo Power Company, which currently owns and operates the power station.

The units of the facility were commissioned in six separate phases, each phase consisting of two units, rated at 600 MW each, all of which run on coal. The 1st and 2nd units were commissioned in June and July 2003, the 3rd and 4th units were commissioned in July and September 2004, the 5th and 6th units were commissioned in September and November 2005, the 7th and 8th units were commissioned in June 2006 and 9th and 10th units were commissioned in 2011. Two more 660 MW ultra-supercritical units were commissioned in 2017.

Electricity is delivered to Beijing via 500-kV transmission lines.

The interval of 50 days between the commissioning of the two units of Phase I set a new record of the shortest construction time among comparable units in the North China region.

== Fuel supply ==
The power plant exploits coal from the Junggar Coalfield approximately 50 km (31 mi) away, and meets its water requirements by pumping its needs from the Yellow River, located 12 km (7 mi) away.

== See also ==
- List of coal power stations
- List of largest power stations
- List of power stations in China
