= Longyangxia Dam =

Dam in Gonghe, Qinghai, China

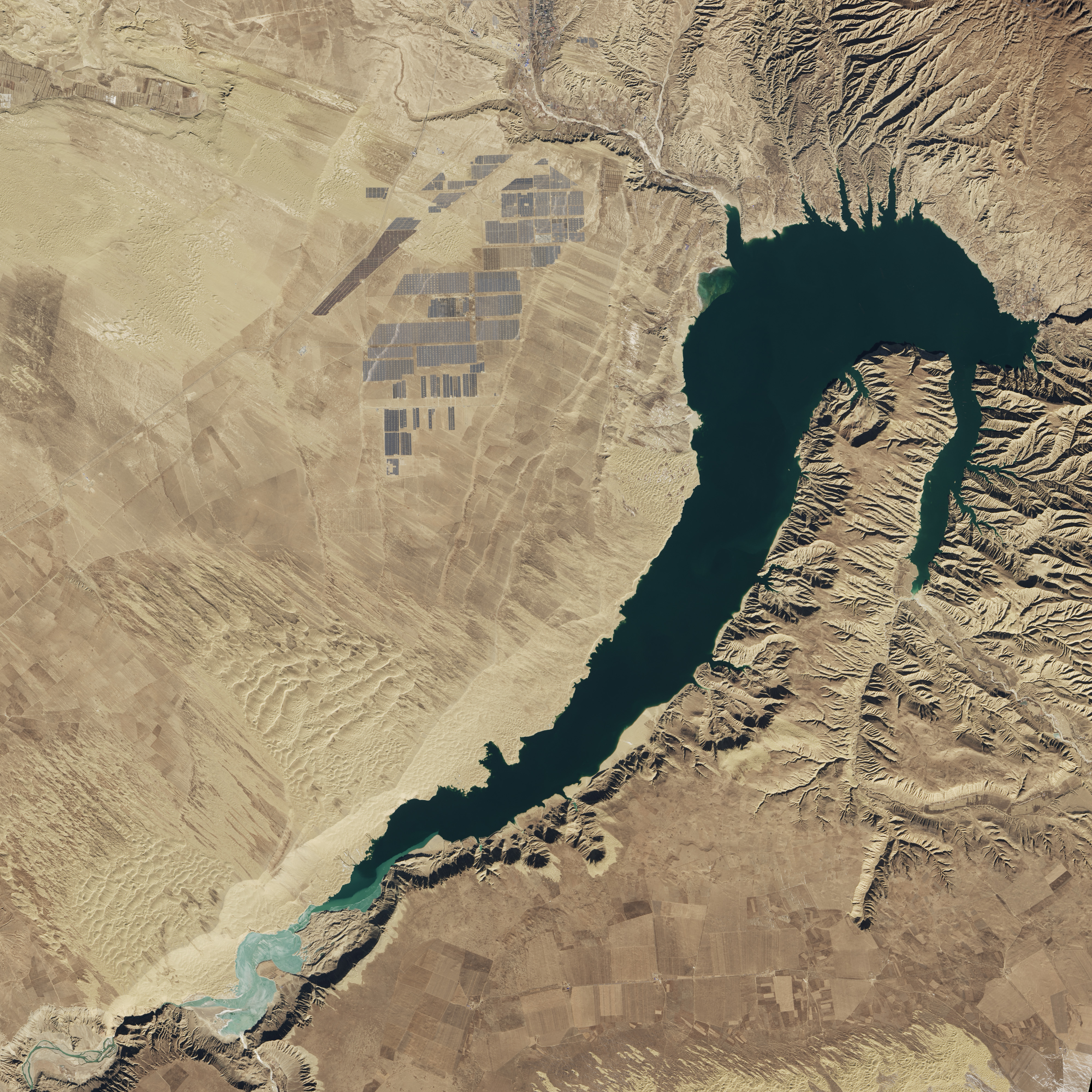
- Satellite picture of the Longyangxia Dam reservoir and solar power park

- Location within China
- Country: China
- Location: Gonghe County, Qinghai Province
- Coordinates: 36°07′20″N 100°55′06″E
- Status: In use
- Construction began: 1976
- Opening date: 1992

Dam and spillways
- Type of dam: Arch gravity dam
- Impounds: Yellow River
- Height: 178 metres (584 ft)
- Length: 396 metres (1,299 ft)
- Width (crest): 18.5 metres (61 ft)
- Width (base): 80 metres (262 ft)
- Spillway type: Service, gate-controlled on crest

Reservoir
- Creates: Longyangxia Reservoir
- Total capacity: 24.7 billion cubic metres (20,000,000 acre⋅ft)
- Catchment area: 752,443 square kilometres (290,520 sq mi)
- Surface area: 383 square kilometres (148 sq mi)

Power Station
- Hydraulic head: 122 metres (400 ft) (design)
- Turbines: 4 x 320 MW
- Installed capacity: 1,280 MW; 1,400 MW (max. planned)
- Annual generation: 6 TWh

Longyangxia Dam Solar Park
- Commission date: 2014
- Construction cost: CN¥6 billion

Power generation
- Nameplate capacity: 850 MW

The Longyangxia Dam is a concrete arch-gravity dam at the entrance of the Longyangxia canyon on the Yellow River in Gonghe County, Qinghai Province, China. The dam is 178 metres (584 ft) tall and was built for the purposes of hydroelectric power generation, irrigation, ice control and flood control. The dam supports a 1,280 MW power station with 4 x 320 MW generators that can operate at a maximum capacity of 1400 MW. Controlling ice, the dam controls downstream releases to reservoirs lower in the river, allowing them to generate more power instead of mitigating ice. Water in the dam's 24.7×10^{9} m^{3} (20.0×10^{6} acre⋅ft) reservoir provides irrigation water for up to 1,000,000 hectares (2,471,054 acres) of land.

The dam is composed of its main body and a gravity pier and secondary dam on both its left and right flank. The dam's service spillway contains two 12-metre-wide (39 ft) gates that discharge water into two 260-metre-long (850 ft) and 280-metre-long (920 ft) chutes. Downstream discharges are also controlled by a similar single-chute middle outlet and the lower outlet works.

== Photovoltaic power station ==
In 2013 a solar photovoltaic station was built with a nameplate capacity of 320 MWp (Phase I), covering 9 square kilometres (3.5 sq mi). An additional 530 MW_{p} (Phase II) was completed in 2015, covering further 14 square kilometres (5.4 sq mi), making Longyangxia Dam Solar Park, with 850 MW_{p} capacity, one of the largest photovoltaic power stations in the world.

The solar power station is integrated with the hydroelectric power station. The park is coupled to one of the hydroelectric turbines, which automatically regulates the output to balance the variable generation from solar before dispatching power to the grid. This limits the problems connected to variable solar generation while helping to conserve water.

These solar stations can be perceived as a part of the much larger Talatan Solar Park in the vicinity or the reservoir.

== See also ==
- List of power stations in China
