= List of power stations in Peru =

Location of power stations in Peru:
Coal, gas, hydro

The following is a list of the power stations in Peru.

== Coal ==
| Name | Location | Capacity (MW) | Commissioned | Owner | Refs |
|---|---|---|---|---|---|
| Ilo2 | | 135 | 2000 | EnerSur | |

== Gas ==
| Name | Location | Capacity (MW) | Commissioned | Type | Owner | Refs |
|---|---|---|---|---|---|---|
| Chilca Kallpa | Canete | 870 | 2007–2012 | combined cycle | | |
| Chilca Uno | Canete | 852 | 2006–2012 | combined cycle | | |
| Malacas | Talara | 96 | 1998 | | | |
| Mollendo | | 105 | 1997–1999 | | | |
| Santo Domingo de los Olleros | Canete | 200 | 2013 | | | |
| Termoselva | Padre Abad | 156 | 1998 | | | |
| Ventanilla | Callao | 498 | 1998–2006 | combined cycle | | |

== Hydroelectric ==
| Name | Location | Capacity (MW) | Commissioned | Owner | Refs |
|---|---|---|---|---|---|
| Cahua | | 43 | 1967 | | |
| Chimay | | 140 | 2000 | | |
| Mantaro-Tablachaca | Southern Peru | 1008 | 1973–1984 | | |
| Monbamba | | 6 | 1998 | | |
| Oroya | | 9 | 1914 | | |
| Purmacana | | 2 | 2011 | | |
| Santa Cruz Ancash | | 12 | 2009–2010 | | |
| Yaupo | | 108 | 1957–1968 | | |
| Yuncan | | 132 | 2005 | | |

== See also ==
- Electricity sector in Peru
- List of largest power stations in the world
