= List of power stations in Saudi Arabia =

This article lists all power stations in Saudi Arabia.

== Fossil fuel ==
=== Natural gas turbine ===
Plant	Community	Coordinates	Capacity (MW)	Year completed	Ref
Ghazlan	Ras Tanura	26°51′14″N 49°53′51″E	4,256	1980, 2003	
Qurayyah IPP	Abqaiq	25°51′33″N 50°07′01″E	3,927	2014	
Rabigh 2 IPP	Makkah Province		2,060	2017	
Shuqaiq 2 IWPP	Jizan		850	2010	
Ha'il-2	Ha'il		1000	1985-2015	
Jubail Marafiq	Ash Sharqiyah		2,740	2009-2010	
Rabigh-2	Makkah Province		826	1988-1993	
Ras Tanura	Ash Sharqiyah		148	2006	
Riyadh	Ar Riyad		5,336	1997-2012	
Shedqum	Ash Sharqiyah		306	2006	
Uthmaniya	Ash Sharqiyah		306	2006	

=== Oil-fired ===
Plant	Community	Coordinates	Capacity (MW)	Year completed	Ref
Al-Jubail					
Al-Khobar					
Yanbu II	Madina Province	23.910038, 38.322421	690	2016	
Al-Shuaibah		20°40′32″N 39°31′38″E	5,600	2001-2012	
RIPP-1 RABEC Power, Rabigh	Mecca Province		1320	2012-13	

== Renewable ==
=== Solar ===
Plant	Community	Coordinates	Capacity (MW)	Year completed	Ref
	Farasan Island		0.5	2011	
Sakaka IPP Photovoltaic	Al-Jawf Province	29.737661435314752, 40.10550978773505	300	2019	

=== Wind ===
Plant	Community	Coordinates	Capacity (MW)	Year completed	Ref
Dumat Al Jandal Wind Farm	Dumah Al Jandal		400	2022	

== Storage ==
=== Pumped hydroelectric ===
Plant	Community	Coordinates	Capacity (MW)	Year completed	Ref
Baysh Dam	Baysh, Jizan Region		1000	Planning in progress, dam already in place	

== See also ==
- Energy in Saudi Arabia
