= Jamaica Public Service =

Electricity utility in Jamaica

Jamaica Public Service Company Ltd.
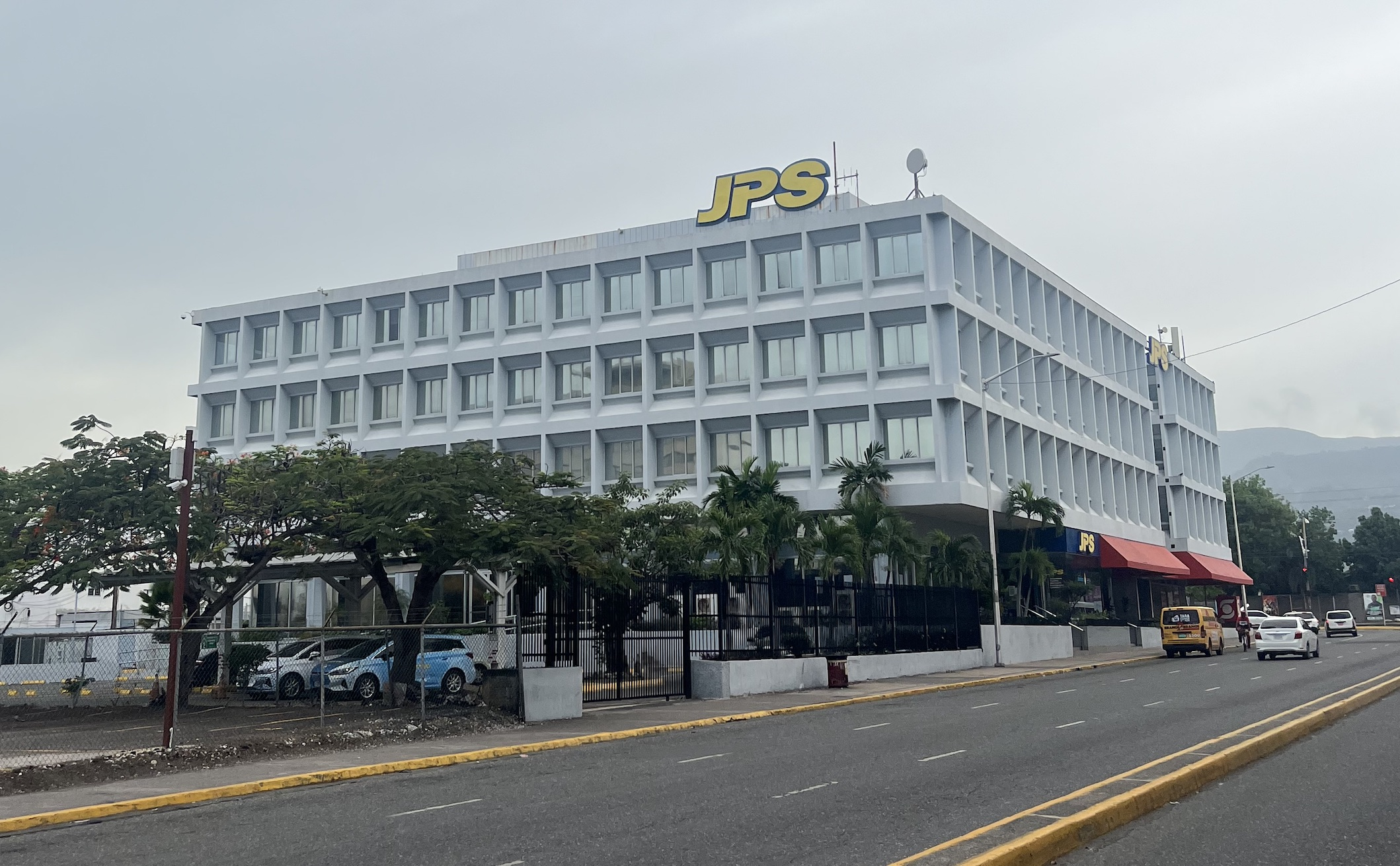
- Head office in Kingston, Jamaica
- Type: Private Company
- Industry: Energy
- Predecessors: West India Electric Company; Jamaica Electric Light and Power Company
- Founded: 25 May 1923; 103 years ago in Kingston, Jamaica
- Headquarters: Kingston, Jamaica
- Area served: Jamaica
- Products: Electricity
- Revenue: ▼US$1.076 billion (2025)
- Operating income: ▼US$84.1 million (2025)
- Net income: ▼US$28.9 million (2025)
- Total assets: ▲US$1.969 billion (2025)
- Total equity: ▲US$647.7 million (2025)
- Number of employees: ca. 1600
- Website: www.jpsco.com

The Jamaica Public Service Company Limited (JPS) is the only electricity utility in Jamaica. As a single buyer, it owns and operates the island's transmission and distribution networks as a monopoly, and also owns a significant share of electricity generation.

Originally founded in 1923 as a private company, JPS was nationalised in 1970. In 2001 it was privatised again, and is now owned by Marubeni and the Korea Electric Power Corporation, with the Government of Jamaica holding a minority stake. On 1 July 2025, the Government of Jamaica formally gave notice to JPS of its intention not to renew its licence under the existing terms.

As of 2025, JPS annually sells over 3.2 TWh of electricity to 709,963 customers in Jamaica.

== History ==
In the early twentieth century, Jamaica had several small regional electricity companies. JPS was founded in this competitive market on the 25 May 1923, with just 3,928 customers. It assumed the licences and stock of both the West India Electric Company and the Jamaica Electric Light and Power Company, who operated Bog Walk hydro station and Gold Street power station, as well as Kingston's tram system. The capital in JPS, at its foundation, was "primarily Canadian". The first general manager was Alfred S. Nichols, an employee of Stone & Webster. Nichols remained as general manager for 15 years, until his death in 1938.

Over the next few decades, JPS acquired or merged with rival electricity providers, emerging as the island's dominant power company by 1945. In 1966, its dominant position was recognised by the Government in the form of the first "All-Island Electric Licence", which granted it a formal monopoly. Shortly afterwards, in 1970, JPS was nationalised by the Government of Hugh Shearer. This new status quo persisted for 31 years until the Government of P. J. Patterson privatised the firm in 2001, as part of a programme of national economic and fiscal reforms. The Jamaican Government sold an 80% stake to the American Mirant Corporation, for US$201 million.

Mirant sold its 80% stake to the Japanese firm Marubeni in 2007, along with the rest of its Caribbean holdings, for about US$732 million. Marubeni in turn sold half of its stake in 2009 to the Emirati firm TAQA. After two years TAQA exercised an exit clause to divest, with the Korean firm KEPCO ultimately taking on its 40% share, for US$285 million.

As of 2025 JPS is owned 40% by Marubeni, 40% by KEPCO and 19.9% by the Government of Jamaica, with the remainder held by approximately 3,000 private shareholders.

== Regulation and licence ==
JPS is regulated by the Office of Utilities Regulation, and its activities are governed by the Electricity Act of 2015 and its Electricity Licence, issued in 2016.

The current licence runs to 8 July 2027, scheduled to automatically renew for another 10 years unless the Government of Jamaica gives notice by the 8 July 2025. On 1 July 2025, Minister for Science, Energy, Telecommunications and Transport, Daryl Vaz, announced that the Government of Jamaica had formally given notice to JPS of its intention not to renew the licence on its existing terms. According to the Minister, the Government will seek new and improved terms under which to licence a private operator in 2027; this operator could be JPS' existing owners, or new investors. In the case that the Government wishes to replace the operator of JPS, it is obliged to pay 'fair market value' to the current owners, as determined by an independent team of valuation experts.

== Operations ==
JPS owns and operates the transmission and distribution networks in Jamaica. It owns a large share of generation, although most electricity is provided by independent power providers, or IPPs.

=== Generation ===
JPS owners and operates a mixture of diesel, gas and hydropower plants. As of 2024, the generation mix from JPS's plants was 65% gas, 24% diesel and 11% hydro. It also has a stake in the South Jamaica Power Company, which operates a 194 MW gas plant.

As part of the privatisation of JPS in 2001, the generation market was opened to competition. Today IPPs provide 75% of the total generation in Jamaica.

As per the Electricity Licence, JPS has a right of first refusal to replace its own generation. Otherwise new generation is procured by the Generation Procurement Entity.

=== Transmission and distribution ===
JPS is the sole transmission operator in Jamaica, and owns the transmission network. Its network comprises around 16,000 km of cables ringing the island, of which 1,264 km are 138 kV and 69 kV transmission lines. The distribution system operates at voltages of 24 kV, 12 kV, 13.8 kV and 4 kV.

==== Customers ====
As of 2024, JPS serves 701,670 customers, the vast majority being residential. The majority of demand is from industrial and commercial customers, comprising 63% of the total. The National Water Commission is JPS' single biggest customer, accounting for about 5% of total demand.

JPS has achieved a high degree of smart meter penetration, with 99.7% of customers having smart meters as of April 2025, with approximately 2,000 left to install.

Jamaicans pay relatively high prices for electricity, around US$0.36 per kWh in 2024. Depending on the metric used, Jamaican power prices are in the top 20 or even top 10 countries worldwide.

==== Losses ====
The JPS electricity system in Jamaica suffers high losses. In 2024 its total losses were 27.3%, with a five-year average of 27.8%. The majority of this comes from theft. There are as many as 180,000 illegal connections, equivalent to 26% of the legitimate customer base - an increase from 140,000 illegal connections in 2010. The cost of these losses may add as much as 8.7% to the bills of paying customers, with an overall cost of US$260 million. The Government has plans to reduce losses to 12.3% by 2035.

== See also ==
- List of power stations in Jamaica
