= Alessandro Volta Power Plant =

Alessandro Volta thermal power station
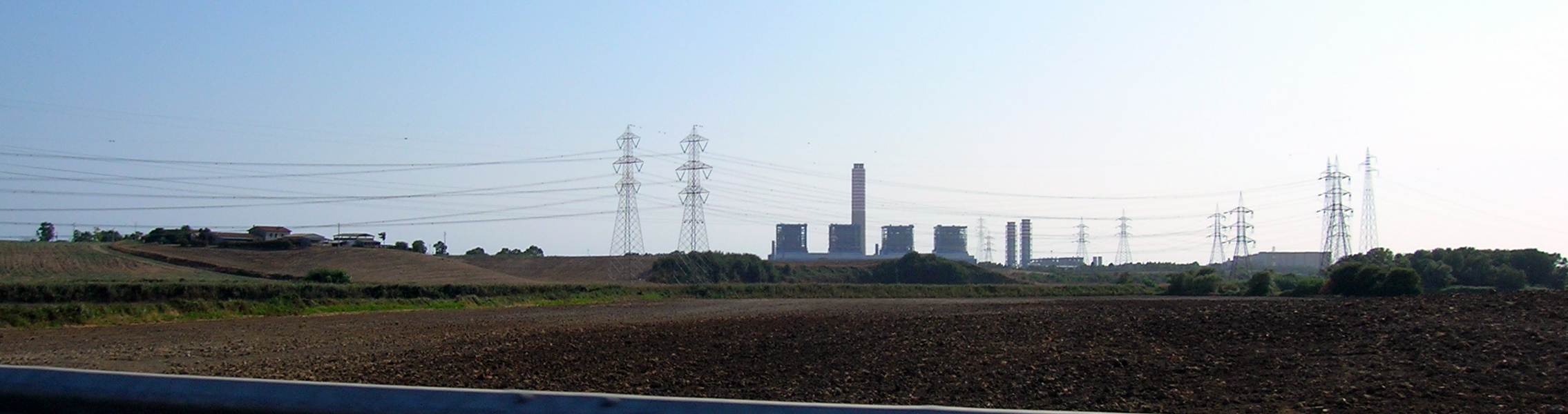
- Country: Italy
- Coordinates: 42°21′30″N 11°32′11″E
- Status: Operational
- Commission date: 1992
- Owner: Enel

Power generation
- Nameplate capacity: 3,600 MW

External links
- Website: corporate.enel.it/it/futur-e/impianti/montalto-di-castro
- Commons: Related media on Commons

Alessandro Volta Power Plant on the right, on the left the Alto Lazio nuclear power plant.

The Alessandro Volta Power Plant was a 3600 MW polycombustible thermal power plant located in the municipality of Montalto di Castro and owned by Enel.

It was commissioned in 1989 near the unfinished Montalto di Castro Nuclear Power Station of which it used part of the site and the sea water intakes already built.

It was decommissioned in 2019 and scheduled for disposal and is being negotiated for conversion into data centers for IT companies.

== Construction ==
The plant consisted of four 660 MW steam units that could be fired by either dense fuel oil or natural gas, and eight small 120-125 MW Nuovo Pignone (125MW) and Fiat (120MW) turbogas units paired in a combined cycle with the steam units.

It was the most powerful thermal power plant in Italy but was relatively underutilized (about 3000 hours per year out of a theoretical maximum of 8760), due to the high cost of fuel.

== Emissions ==
In 2009, the plant emitted one million tons of carbon dioxide into the atmosphere, fully offset by the purchase of approximately one million CERs.

Specifically, in order to gain possession of the necessary CERs, Enel has invested in a project in China that involves the destruction of tons of trifluoromethane (also known by the abbreviation HFC-23, it is a very dangerous greenhouse gas). In this way, providing on the one hand the removal of greenhouse gases in China, it comes into possession of credits that allow it to emit an equivalent amount of carbon dioxide in Italy.

== See also ==
- List of power stations in Italy
- Electricity sector in Italy
