= Tamakoshi River =

Tamakoshi
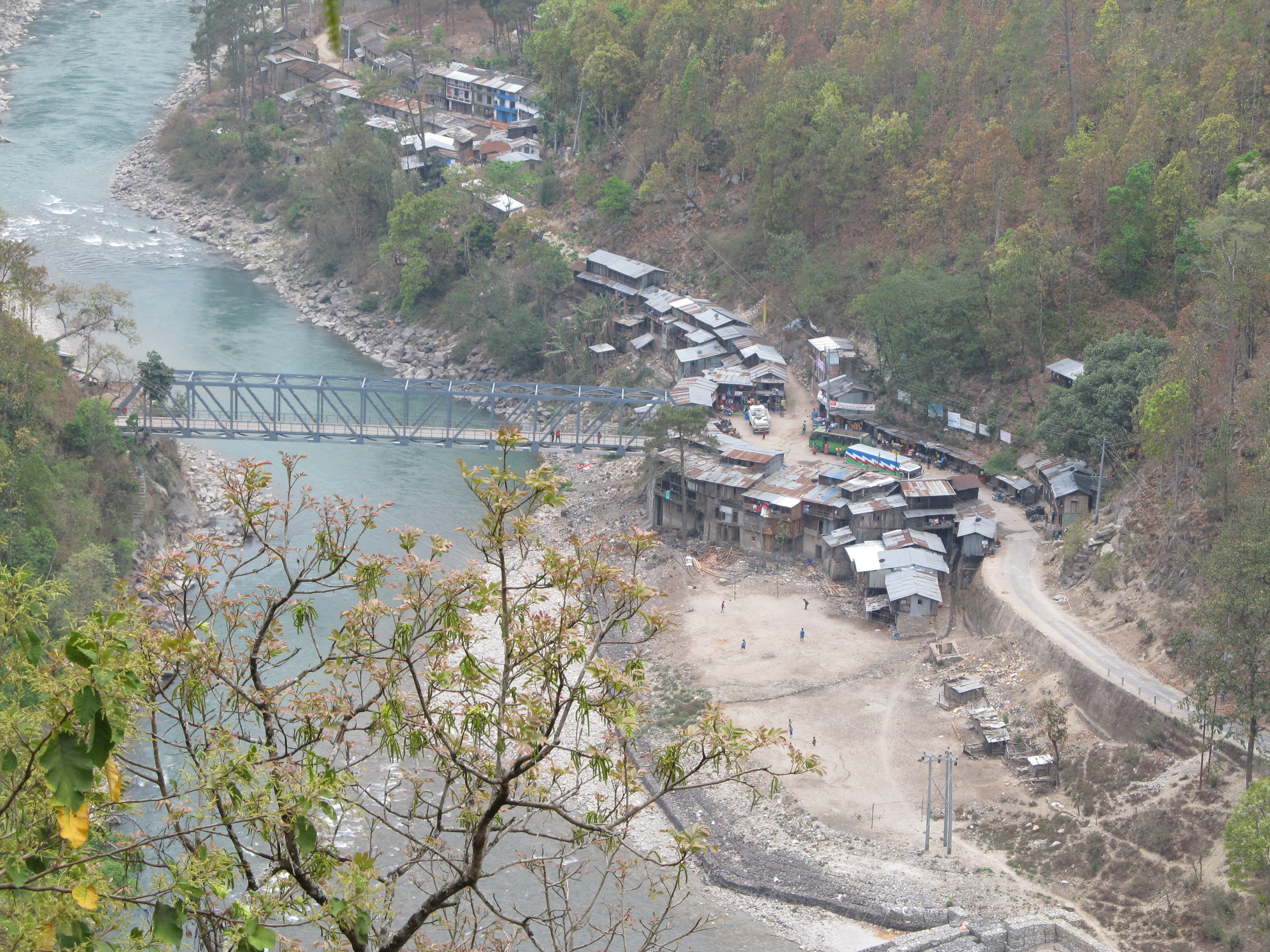
- Tamakoshi River at Nayapool
- Native name: तामाकोशी (Nepali)

Location
- Country: Nepal
- Province: Bagmati Province
- City: Dolakha District

Physical characteristics
- Source: Rongshar Chu and Lapchi Gang
  - coordinates: 27°57′54″N 86°13′9″E
- Mouth: Confluence with Sun Kosi
  - coordinates: 27°21′6″N 85°58′58″E
- Length: 92 km (57 mi)

Basin features
- Tributaries
  - left: Rolwaling Chu, Khimti Khola
  - right: Chyadu Khola

The Tamakoshi River (Nepali: तामाकोशी) is part of the Koshi or Sapta Koshi river system in Nepalese Himalayas. It originates from the Rongshar Chu (or Rongshar Tsangpo) and Lapchi Gang rivers close to the Lamabagar Nepal-Tibet border. It flows in a southern direction through Bagmati Province in Nepal, namely through Dolakha District and Ramechhap District.

== Infrastructures ==
=== Hydropower ===
- Just above the confluence of Rolwaling Chu, Upper Tamakoshi Hydroelectric Project has been operating since July 2021; currently it is the largest hydroelectric project in Nepal, with a power output equivalent to two-thirds of Nepal's current power generation.
- Down the river in the bank, Khimti Power Plant, which was built between 1996 and 2000 is located in Khimti providing 60 MW from Khimti River.
- Sipring Khola Hydropower Station (10 MW)
