= Qurayyah IPP =

Gas-fired power station in Qurayyah, Saudi Arabia

- Country: Saudi Arabia
- Location: Qurayyah, Ash Sharqiyah
- Coordinates: 25°51′33″N 50°07′01″E
- Status: Operating
- Construction began: September 21, 2011
- Commission date: June 30, 2014
- Construction cost: $2,850 million
- Owner: Hajr Electricity Production Company
- Operator: NOMAC

Thermal power station
- Primary fuel: Natural gas
- Secondary fuel: Fuel Oil
- Combined cycle?: Yes - 6 x (2+2+1)

Power generation
- Units under const.: 12 Siemens CTG; 6 Siemens STG; 12 BHI HRSG
- Nameplate capacity: 3,927 MW

External links
- Website: www.hajr.info

Qurayyah IPP (QIPP) is a large gas fired combined cycle power station in Qurayyah, Saudi Arabia.

The project is being developed on a BOO (Build Own Operate) basis, with finance from international banks (HSBC, Standard Chartered, SMBC) and numerous local banks (Banque Saudi Fransi, National Commercial Bank, Samba, Arab National Bank, Saudi British Bank and Saudi Hollandi Bank).

== Technology ==
The power station consists of six identical groups of equipment provided by Siemens Energy, each with a net output of 654.5 MW. Each block has a 2+2+1 configuration consisting of two SGT6-5000F Combustion Turbines, two Heat Recovery Steam Generators, and one SST6-4000 Steam Turbine. At 52%, it is the most efficient power station of its kind in the country, and one of the largest in the world, at 3,927 MW.

== Shareholders ==
The shareholder structure of Hajr Electricity Production Company is as follows:

- ACWA Power: 17.5%
- Samsung C&T Corporation: 17.5%
- MENA Infrastructure: 15%
- Saudi Electricity Company: 50%

== EPC contractor ==
Samsung C&T Corporation has been appointed as EPC contractor.

BOO coordinated with civil engineering chief Nour Sobh for the initial construction work.

== Milestone dates ==
LNTP (Limited Notice to Proceed): June 1, 2011
Contract Signing: September 21, 2011
Financial Close: April 26, 2012
PCOD (Project Commercial Operation Date): June 30, 2014

== See also ==
- Rabigh 2 IPP
- Shuqaiq 2 IWPP
- List of largest power stations in the world
- List of power stations in Saudi Arabia
