= List of power stations in Jamaica =

This is a list of electricity-generating power stations in Jamaica, sorted by type and name.

In Jamaica, the Jamaica Public Service Company (JPS) has a monopoly on the "transmission, distribution and supply of electricity". However, JPS does not have a monopoly on electricity generation. Jamaica also has Independent Power Providers (IPPs) which "are private entities that own and operate facilities to generate electricity for sale to the national grid."

== Coal-fired ==
| Name | Operator | Location | Parish | Capacity (MW) | Commissioned | Decommissioned |
|---|---|---|---|---|---|---|
| Gold Street Power Station | Jamaica Public Service Company (Note: Gold Street was operated by Jamaica Electric Light Company from 1892–1897, Jamaica Electric Light and Power Company from 1897–1907, West India Electric Company from 1907–1923, and then Jamaica Public Service Company from then until its decommissioning.) | 17.9672°N 76.7867°W | Kingston | 0.3 | 1892 | 1970 |

== Oil- and gas-fired ==
| Name | Operator | Location | Parish | Fuel | Capacity (MW) | Commissioned | Decommissioned |
|---|---|---|---|---|---|---|---|
| Bahia Principe Runaway Bay Cogeneration Plant | Sampol | 18.4602°N 77.3500°W | St Ann | Heavy fuel oil (HFO) and diesel | 8.1 | 2017 | - |
| Bogue Power Station | Jamaica Public Service Company (JPS) | 18.4512°N 77.9187°W | St James | Liquefied natural gas (LNG) | 120 | 1973 | - |
| Doctor Bird Power Station | Jamaica Energy Partners Group (JEP) | 17.8967°N 77.1060°W | St Catherine | HFO and diesel | 124.4 | 1995 (Note: Unit 1 was commissioned in 1995 and Unit 2 in 2006.) | - |
| Grand Palladium Jamaica Trigeneration Plant | Sampol | 18.4576°N 78.1508°W | Hanover | LNG, diesel, and solar | 10.1 | 2020 | - |
| H10 Ocean Coral Spring Trigeneration Plant | Sampol | 18.4855°N 77.5757°W | Trelawney | LNG and diesel | 2.65 | 2000 | - |
| Hunt's Bay Power Station | JPS | 17.9723°N 76.8098°W | Kingston | HFO and diesel | 122.5 | 1953–62 (Note: A Station was commissioned in 1953–62, Units GT1 and GT2 in 1969–70, Units GT4 and GT5 in 1974, and B Station in 1976.) | 2023 |
| Jamaica Broilers Cogeneration Plant | Jamaica Broilers Group | 17.9660°N 77.0707°W | St Catherine | LNG | 6.5 | 2025 | - |
| Jamaica Private Power Company | JEP | 17.9711°N 76.7524°W | Kingston | HFO and diesel | 60 | 1998 | - |
| Jamalco Power Plant | New Fortress Energy | 17.8965°N 77.2401°W | Clarendon | LNG | 150 | 2020 | - |
| Montego Bay Electric Plant | JPS (Note: Montego Bay was operated by St James Public Utilities Company from 1927–30, St James Utilities Limited, an affiliate of Jamaica Public Service Company, from 1930–49, and by JPS itself from then until its decommissioning.) | 18.4737°N 77.9212°W | St James | Diesel | | 1927 | >1949 |
| Old Harbour Power Station | JPS | 17.8998°N 77.1064°W | St Catherine | HFO | 223.5 | 1968–73 | 2020 |
| Port Antonio Electric Plant | JPS (Note: Port Antonio was operated by St James Utilities Limited, an affiliate of Jamaica Public Service Company, from 1931–49, and by JPS itself from then until its decommissioning.) | 18.1821°N 76.4606°W | Portland | Diesel | | 1931 | >1949 |
| Port Maria Electric Plant | E. Prendergast | | St Mary | Diesel | | | |
| Rockfort Diesel Station | JPS | 17.9689°N 76.7519°W | Kingston | Diesel | 36 | 1985 | - |
| South Jamaica Power Centre | JPS | 17.9004°N 77.1082°W | St Catherine | LNG | 192 | 2019 | - |
| The Nest Power Station | JPS | 17.9670°N 76.9688°W | St Catherine | LNG | 10 | 2021 | - |
| UWI Co-generation Plant | Mona-Tech Engineering Services | 18.00841°N 76.7496°W | St Andrew | LNG | 7 | 2017 | - |
| West Kingston Power Partners | JEP | 17.9711°N 76.8056°W | Kingston | HFO and diesel | 65.5 | 2013 | - |

== Hydro-electric power ==
| Name | Operator | Location | Parish | Capacity (MW) | Commissioned | Decommissioned |
|---|---|---|---|---|---|---|
| Bog Walk Hydro Station | Jamaica Public Service Company (JPS) (Note: Bog Walk was operated by West India Electric Company from 1899–1923, and by JPS from then until its decommissioning.) | 18.0823°N 76.9936°W | St Catherine | 3 | 1899 | 1966 |
| Constant Spring Hydroelectric Plant | JPS | 18.0650°N 76.7853°W | St Andrew | 0.8 | 1989 | - |
| Lower White River Hydroelectric Plant | JPS | | St Ann | 4.8 | 1952 | - |
| Maggotty Falls Hydroelectric Plant | JPS | 18.1550°N 77.7581°W | St Elizabeth | 13.2 | 1959 (Note: Plant A was commissioned in 1959 and Plant B in 2014.) | - |
| Rams Horn Hydroelectric Plant | JPS | | St Andrew | 0.6 | 1989 | - |
| Rio Bueno A Hydroelectric Plant | JPS | | Trelawney | 2.5 | 1966 | - |
| Rio Bueno B Hydroelectric Plant | JPS | | Trelawney | 1.1 | 1988 | - |
| Roaring River Hydroelectric Plant | JPS | 18.4214°N 77.1499°W | St Ann | 4.5 | 1949 | - |
| Upper White River Hydroelectric Plant | JPS | 18.3755°N 77.0516°W | St Ann | 3.6 | 1945 | - |

== Wind power ==
| Name | Operator | Location | Parish | Number of turbines | Capacity (MW) | Commissioned | Decommissioned |
|---|---|---|---|---|---|---|---|
| InterEnergy Jamaica Wind | InterEnergy | 17.9403°N 77.6923°W | St Elizabeth | 11 | 36 | 2016 | - |
| Munro Wind Farm | Jamaica Public Service Company | 17.9247°N 77.6858°W | St Elizabeth | 4 | 3 | 2010 | - |
| Wigton Windfarm | Wigton Windfarm Limited | 17.9163°N 77.5420°W | Manchester | 44 | 62.7 | 2004 (Note: Phase 1 was commissioned in 2004, Phase 2 in 2010, and Phase 3 in 2016.) | - |

== Solar power ==
| Name | Operator | Location | Parish | Capacity (MW) | Commissioned | Decommissioned |
|---|---|---|---|---|---|---|
| Content Solar Farm | WRB Enterprises | 17.9462°N 77.3097°W | Clarendon | 20 | 2016 | - |
| Eight Rivers | InterEnergy | 18.2260°N 78.0999°W | Westmoreland | 52 | 2019 | - |

== Biomass ==
| Name | Operator | Location | Parish | Type | Capacity (MW) | Commissioned | Decommissioned |
|---|---|---|---|---|---|---|---|
| Appleton Estate Power Plant | J. Wray & Nephew | 18.1647°N 77.7268°W | St Elizabeth | Bagasse | 2.5 | 2015 | 2020 |
