= Montalto di Castro Nuclear Power Station =

Nuclear power plant in Italy

Montalto di Castro Nuclear Power Plant
- The NPP to the left, to the right the Steam Power Plant Alessandro Volta
- Official name: Centrale elettronucleare Alto Lazio
- Country: Italy
- Coordinates: 42°21′31.68″N 11°31′53.04″E
- Status: Cancelled
- Construction began: 1 July 1982
- Decommission date: 1 January 1988
- Owner: Enel
- Operator: Enel

Nuclear power station
- Reactor type: BWR

Power generation
- Units cancelled: 2 x 982 MW
- Nameplate capacity: 2,018 MW

External links
- Commons: Related media on Commons

The Montalto di Castro nuclear power station was a nuclear power plant at Montalto di Castro in Italy. Consisting of two BWR units each of 982 MWe, it was approaching completion in 1988 when the Italian government decided to close all nuclear plants as a result of the 1987 referendum. In February 1988 the two units were eighty percent complete, representing about a five billion dollars investment. It never operated.

Its area and some of the already built structures are now used by the fossil-fuel power station "Alessandro Volta", the biggest power station in Italy.

In 2024, Enel and solar power developer Comal announced the construction of the Tracker Sun Hunter factory, a solar tracker manufacturing facility that will be built inside the Montalto di Castro nuclear power station.

== Reactor data ==
The nuclear power plant has two units:

Unit	Reactor type	Net capacity	Gross capacity	Start of construction	Mothballed
Montalto di Castro-1	BWR/6 (Mark III)	982 MW	1009 MW	1 July 1982	1 January 1988
Montalto di Castro-2	BWR/6 (Mark III)	982 MW	1009 MW	1 July 1982	1 July 1988
