= Talatan Solar Park =

Large-scale photovoltaic power complex in Qinghai, China

Talatan Solar Park 塔拉坦太阳能公园 ཏ་ལ་ཏན་ཉི་ནུས་གླིང་།
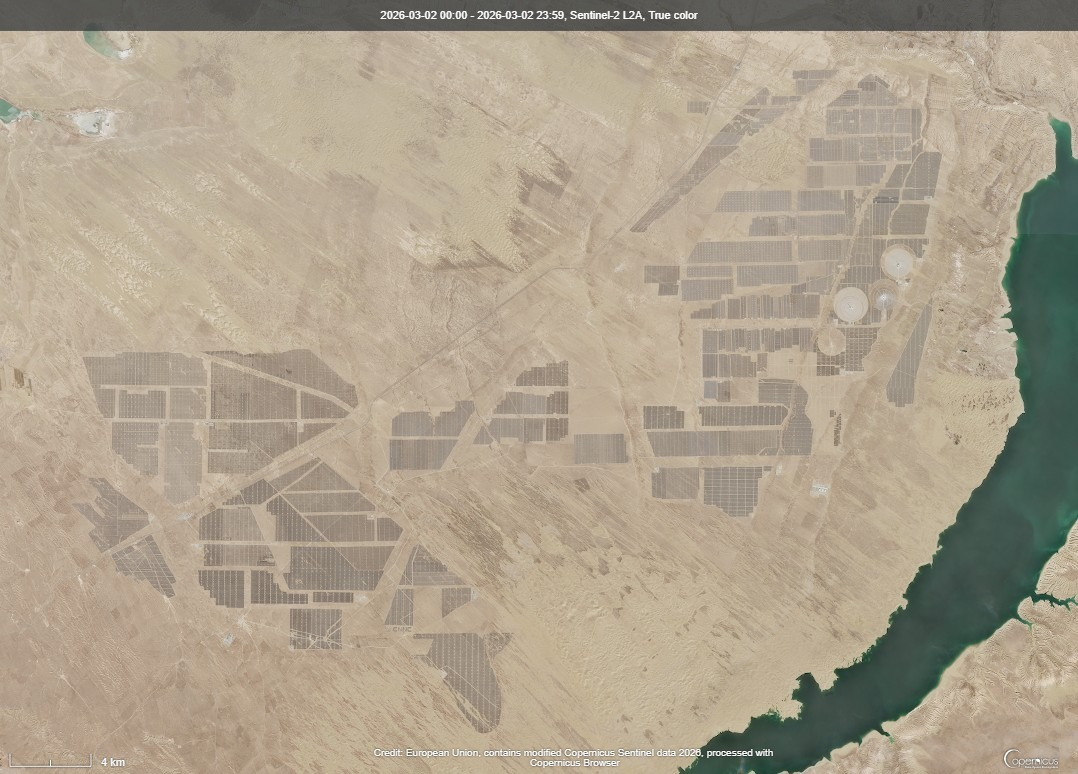
- Satellite image of the solar park with the Longyangxia Dam to the right
- Country: China
- Location: Talatan, Gonghe County, Qinghai
- Coordinates: 36.1907°N 100.5422°E
- Status: Operational
- Construction began: 2011
- Owners: Multiple (park); Major Developer: Huanghe Hydropower Development Co., Ltd. (State Power Investment Corporation)
- Site area: 420 km^{2} (162 sq mi)

Power generation
- Nameplate capacity: 21,000 MW

The Talatan Solar Park, (Note: simplified Chinese: 塔拉坦太阳能公园; traditional Chinese: 塔拉坦太陽能樂園; pinyin: Tǎlātǎn Tàiyángnéng Gōngyuán Tibetan: ཏ་ལ་ཏན་ཉི་ནུས་གླིང་།; wylie: Ta la tan nyi nus gling) officially the Gonghe Talatan Solar Power Plant, (Note: Chinese: 共和塔拉坦太陽能發電廠; pinyin: Gònghé Tǎlātǎn Tàiyángnéng Fādiàn Chǎng Tibetan: གོང་ཧེ་ཏཱ་ལཱ་ཏན་ཉི་ནུས་གློག་འདོན་ས་ཚིགས།; wylie: Gong he ta la tan nyi nus glog 'don sa tshigs) is a large cluster of solar power stations located beside the Longyangxia Dam in Talatan, about 10 km (6.2 mi) southwest of Hainan Tibetan Autonomous Prefecture in Gonghe County, Qinghai Province, China. The solar park's development began in 2011 on the Tibetan Plateau, which stretches to Gansu Province in the northwest. When considered as a single location, it is the world's largest solar power plant in terms of both area and power output as of 2026.

As of March 2026, the total installed solar power in the park is 21 GW, with an average annual electricity generation of over 18,000 GWh.

== Location ==
The solar park lies in Gonghe County in Qinghai Province, in a high-altitude semi-arid environment characterized by strong solar irradiation, low population density, and extensive areas of desertified land. The region has traditionally been used as sheep grazing lands by Tibetan shepherds.

The average altitude here is about 3,000 m (9,800 ft) above the mean sea level.

The area forms part of the broader solar development zone in the Hainan Tibetan Autonomous Prefecture, which also includes projects near the Longyangxia Dam and other sites along the upper Yellow River basin.

== History ==
A coordinated effort to develop large-scale photovoltaic generation in Talatan began around 2011. One of the principal early developers was Huanghe Hydropower Development Co., Ltd., a subsidiary of the State Power Investment Corporation. The project was framed as both an energy and ecological initiative, aimed at utilizing marginal land while reducing wind erosion and improving ground cover.

Over the following decade, additional state-owned and private enterprises constructed multiple utility-scale PV plants within the designated park. By the early 2020s, Talatan had become a flagship location for China's high-altitude solar development strategy.

In 2021, a single 2.2 GW photovoltaic plant in Gonghe County developed by Huanghe Hydropower was identified by industry analysts as one of the largest individual PV power stations in the world at the time.

== Capacity and generation ==
A 2022 report on the Hainan Ecological Photovoltaic Park stated that 46 companies were operating within the Talatan park area and that total installed photovoltaic capacity had reached approximately 16 GW, with average annual generation of around 18,000 GWh.

== Environmental and social aspects ==
Project documentation and government reporting emphasize the integration of solar infrastructure with ecological management. One widely publicized practice is the use of controlled grazing beneath PV arrays—often referred to in Chinese media as "photovoltaic sheep"—to manage vegetation, reduce fire risk, and prevent shading of modules while providing additional income streams for local herders. While the panels were originally too low for sheep to graze, that has since been changed and sheep are an intentional part of the project.

Other measures highlighted in public material include windbreaks, ground-cover planting, and surface stabilization intended to reduce dust accumulation on panels and mitigate wind erosion. These approaches are presented as part of a broader effort to combine renewable energy deployment with land rehabilitation in arid regions.

Unexpected impacts of the solar farm include increased vegetation coverage and soil health. Researchers from the Xi'an University of Technology published findings in Scientific Reports reporting that the panels cause vitality improvements in the soil directly beneath them. The provided shade, trapped moisture, and temperature stabilization led the soil to improve from a classification of 'poor' to 'general'. Another study by researchers at Qinghai University in Frontiers in Environmental Science showed that water content increased 75% under the panels, and the soil could support higher quality vegetation.

== See also ==
- List of photovoltaic power stations
- Solar power in China
- Gonghe County
