= Upper Tamakoshi Hydroelectric Project =

Dam in Dolakha District, Nepal

Upper Tamakoshi Hydropower Project
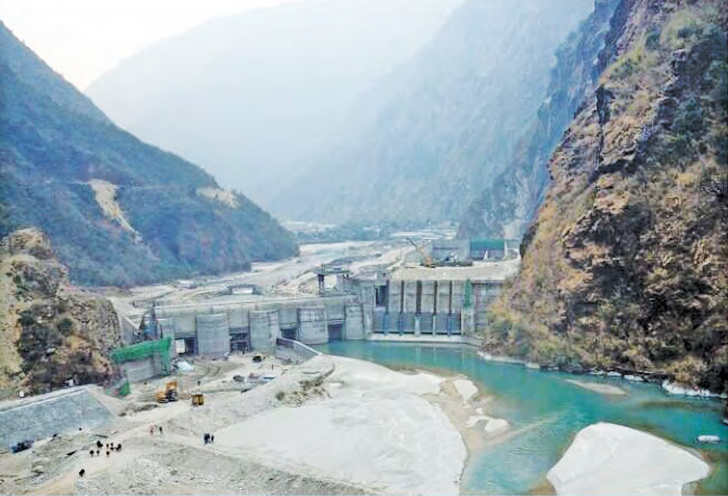
- Upper Tamakoshi diversion dam

- Location within Bagmati Province Location within Nepal
- Country: Nepal
- Location: Gaurishankar Conservation Area, Dolakha District
- Coordinates: 27.844°N 86.218°E
- Purpose: Hydroelectricity
- Status: Operational
- Construction began: 2011
- Opening date: 2021
- Owner: Upper Tamakoshi Hydropower Limited

Dam and spillways
- Type of dam: Run-of-river
- Impounds: Tamakoshi River
- Height: 22 m (72 ft)
- Length: 60 m (200 ft)

Power Station
- Coordinates: 27.925°N 86.213°E
- Type: Underground 142 m long hall
- Hydraulic head: 822 m
- Turbines: 6×Pelton wheels
- Installed capacity: 456 MW @ maximum flow 66 m^{3}/s
- Annual generation: 2,281 GWh
- Website tamakoshihydro.org.np

The Upper Tamakoshi Hydroelectric Project is a 456 MW peaking run-of-the-river hydroelectric project in Nepal. It is the largest hydroelectric project in Nepal, operating since July 2021. It is sited on the Tamakoshi River (also spelled Tama Koshi), a tributary of the Sapt Koshi river (also spelled Saptakoshi), near the Nepal–Tibet border.

The Upper Tamakoshi Hydroelectric Project was a Nepal national priority project. When it is operated at full capacity, it is the largest hydroelectric plant in Nepal, with a power output equivalent to two-thirds of Nepal's current power generation. The project was entirely financed from domestic financial institutions and companies.

== Financing and organization ==
Nepal Electricity Authority (NEA) established an autonomous company named Upper Tamakoshi Hydropower Limited (UTKHPL) in March 2007 (2063/11/25 B.S.) as an executing agency for the implementation of the Project. There are six full-time and two invitee members in the Board of Directors (BoD) at present. Out of six full-time members, four members from NEA, one from Employees Provident Fund (EPF) and one from Nepal Telecom (NTC) are representing in the BoD. Similarly, representatives of Citizen Investment Trust (CIT) and Rastriya Beema Sansthan (RBS) are also in the BoD as invitee members.

The majority share (51%) of the Company is held by four public entities, namely, Nepal Electricity Authority (NEA), Nepal Telecom (NTC), Citizen Investment Trust (CIT) and Rastriya Beema Sansthan (RBS). NEA has 41% stake, NTC has 6% and CIT & RBS each has 2% stake in the Company. Similarly, general public and residents of Dolakha District will have 15% and 10% share respectively. The remaining 24% share will be taken over by contributors in Employees Provident Fund (EPF), NEA & Companys staffs and staffs of financial institutions providing loans.

== Construction ==
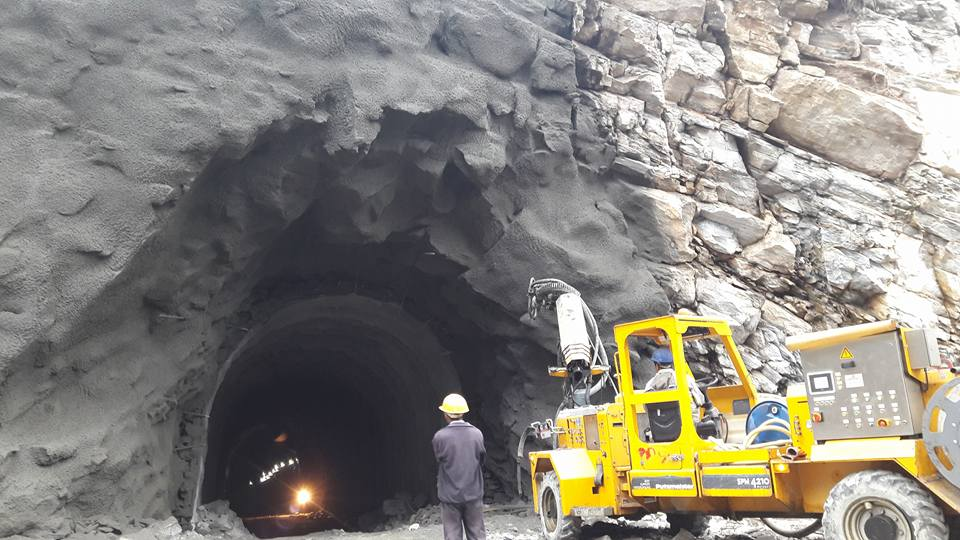
Upper Tamakoshi access tunnel

Construction began in February 2011, and the project was originally slated for completion in July 2018, later pushed back to December 2018, and again pushed back to November 2019. Works suffered new delays in 2019, and the announced completion date of February 2020 was missed too. Sinohydro was the contractor for civil construction, Andritz Hydro GhmH of Austria was the contractor supplying electro-mechanical equipment, and KEC International of India was the contractor for 220 kV transmission line and sub-station.In July of 2021, this project was completed and has been working since.

The consultant for detailed design and construction supervision was Joint Venture Norconsult-Lahmeyer in association with the local sub-consultant Total Management Services. Norconsult is Norway's largest and one of the leading multidisciplinary consultancy firms in the Nordic region. Lahmeyer is a German engineering consultant that in 2019 was re-branded to Tractebel Engineering GmbH The same consultant, JV Norconsult-Lahmeyer was responsible for tender design for the project.

The Nepalese Army was mobilized to provide security to the site in 2012, after it was reportedly threatened by vandalism and threats to construction staff and foreign workers. Work was disrupted by the April 2015 Nepal earthquake, after which over 200 Chinese workers were evacuated. Work was disrupted throughout the construction project by labor strikes. The earthquake also caused damage to roads and bridges and buried the troop barracks at the site.

In May, 2018, it was reported that the planned July completion date could be jeopardized by late assembly of the turbomachinery that had been delivered to the site. Later in May, the country's finance minister said that the project was expected to contribute to robust national economic growth in 2018.

Installation of penstocks began in February 2019 by a European contractor after the original Indian contractor failed to perform the work. A new date of November 2019 was set for initial energy production.

The project was put on hold prior to completion of its testing and commissioning phase in 2020, when skilled foreign workers became unavailable in Nepal due to the global COVID-19 epidemic.

On 5 July 2021, the project was inaugurated by prime minister K. P. Sharma Oli.

== Infrastructure ==
Infrastructure for the plant includes a 142 m long, 25 m high underground powerhouse hall near Gongar Khola, with six Pelton wheels; a 22 m high × 60 m wide dam at Lamabagar; a 360 m high surge shaft; and a total of 16 km of headrace and tailrace tunnels. The gross head will be 822 m. Near the dam are two 246 m × 26 m settling basins to remove particles greater than 0.15 mm.

In January 2019 it was reported that the project did not have approval to clear forest land for new double 220 kVA electrical transmission lines to replace existing 132 kVA lines. After its completion, the first unit started production from 5 July 2021.
