= Shoaiba Power and Desalination Plant =

Combined power and desalination plant in Saudi Arabia

Shoaiba power and desalination plant
- Country: Saudi Arabia
- Coordinates: 20.680084°N 39.523233°E
- Commission date: February 2014
- Owner: Saudi Consolidated Electric Company
- Operator: Saudi Consolidated Electric Company

Thermal power station
- Primary fuel: Fuel oil
- Combined cycle?: Yes

Power generation
- Units operational: 14
- Nameplate capacity: 5,600 MW

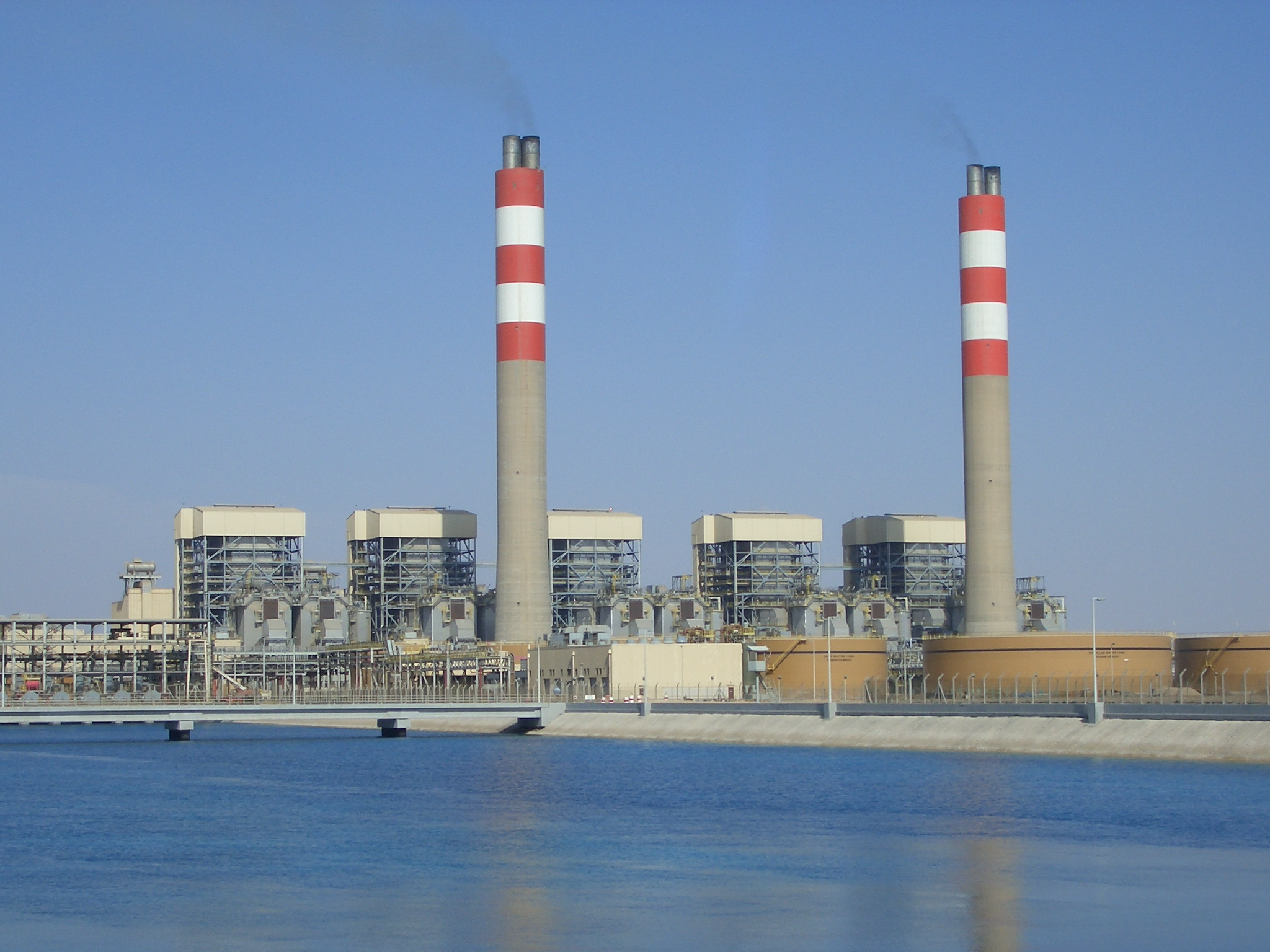
View along the cooling water return (Stage 1, Phase 1 and 2)

The Shoaiba power and desalination plant is an oil-fired, combined cycle gas turbine power and desalination complex in Saudi Arabia on the coast of Red Sea, about 120 kilometres (75 mi) south of Jeddah. It is one of the world's largest fossil fuel power plants, and the world's third largest integrated water and power plant.

== History ==
In 1985, there was a power generation and saline desalination plant in operation at the site, with commissioning support from Stuttgart-based Fichtner Consulting Engineers. Construction of the first plant 1 of the Shoaiba power station began in 1985 and second plant 2 in 1995.

The ABB-led consortium built a power station equipped with three turbines, heat recovery steam generators and ancillary power generation equipment. The first stage cost about US$850 million.

The first unit came into operation in July 2001. The other two units were completed in August 2003. The contract for construction of the second stage was awarded to a consortium led by Alstom Power.

== Desalination plant ==
A multi-stage flash distillation water desalination plant was built by Hanjung, now Doosan Heavy Industries, in partnership with Bechtel. The desalination plant of shoiaba phase 1 and phase 2 has a capacity of 76,800 tons/day. In 2017, awarded ph4 ro plant to doosan, started full production on 2020 February 384,000 m3 per day.

== Technical features ==
The power station has 14 units with a total capacity of 5,600 MW, which makes it one of the largest fossil fuel-fired power stations in the world. The last expansion was built by Alstom and is operational since 2012. The oil for power production is supplied from Saudi Aramco by tankers.

The power station is connected to the 380 kV grid. The potable water is transferred via an 80 kilometres (50 mi) long water pipeline to the national water pipeline network. The power station provides the desalination facility with steam to heat the seawater distillers, while reducing its own cooling demands.

== Operating company ==
The Shoaiba power station Saline Water Conversion Corporation is aided by the kingdom of Saudi Arabia and is monitored by the power and water ministry.
