= Natural gas in Qatar =

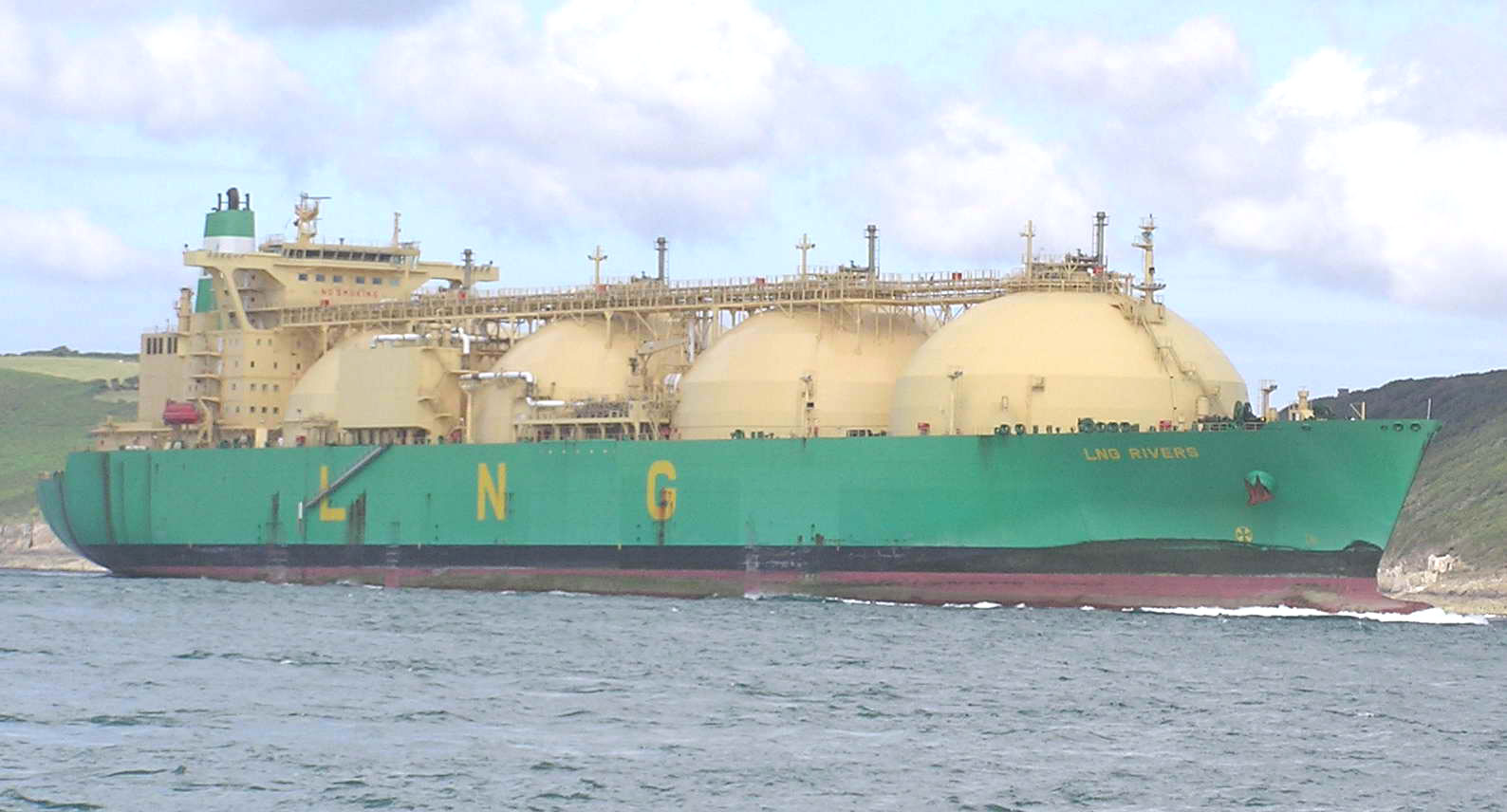
L.N.G. ship.

The natural gas industry in Qatar covers a large portion of the world supply of natural gas. According to the U.S. International Trade Administration, Qatar has the world's third-largest known natural gas reserves after Russia and Iran, with approximately 843 trillion cubic feet of natural gas reserves. The majority of Qatar's natural gas is located in the massive offshore North Field, which spans an area roughly equivalent to Qatar itself. A part of the world's largest non-associated, natural-gas field, the North Field, is a geological extension of Iran's South Pars / North Dome Gas-Condensate field, which holds an additional 450 trillion cubic feet (13 trillion cubic metres) of recoverable natural-gas reserves.

While Qatar is a significant oil producer, the government has devoted more resources to the development of natural gas in the contemporary era, particularly for export as liquefied natural gas (LNG). In 2006, Qatar reportedly surpassed Indonesia to become the largest exporter of LNG in the world. Together, revenues from the oil and natural-gas sectors amount to 60% of the country's GDP. Domestically, Qatar's energy supply is produced almost exclusively by natural gas (99.2%), with oil making up the rest (0.8%).

As of 2021, Qatar was ranked as the world's sixth-largest dry natural gas producer and the second-largest liquefied natural gas (LNG) exporter. It holds the position of being the third-largest holder of natural gas reserves globally.

== Production and exports ==
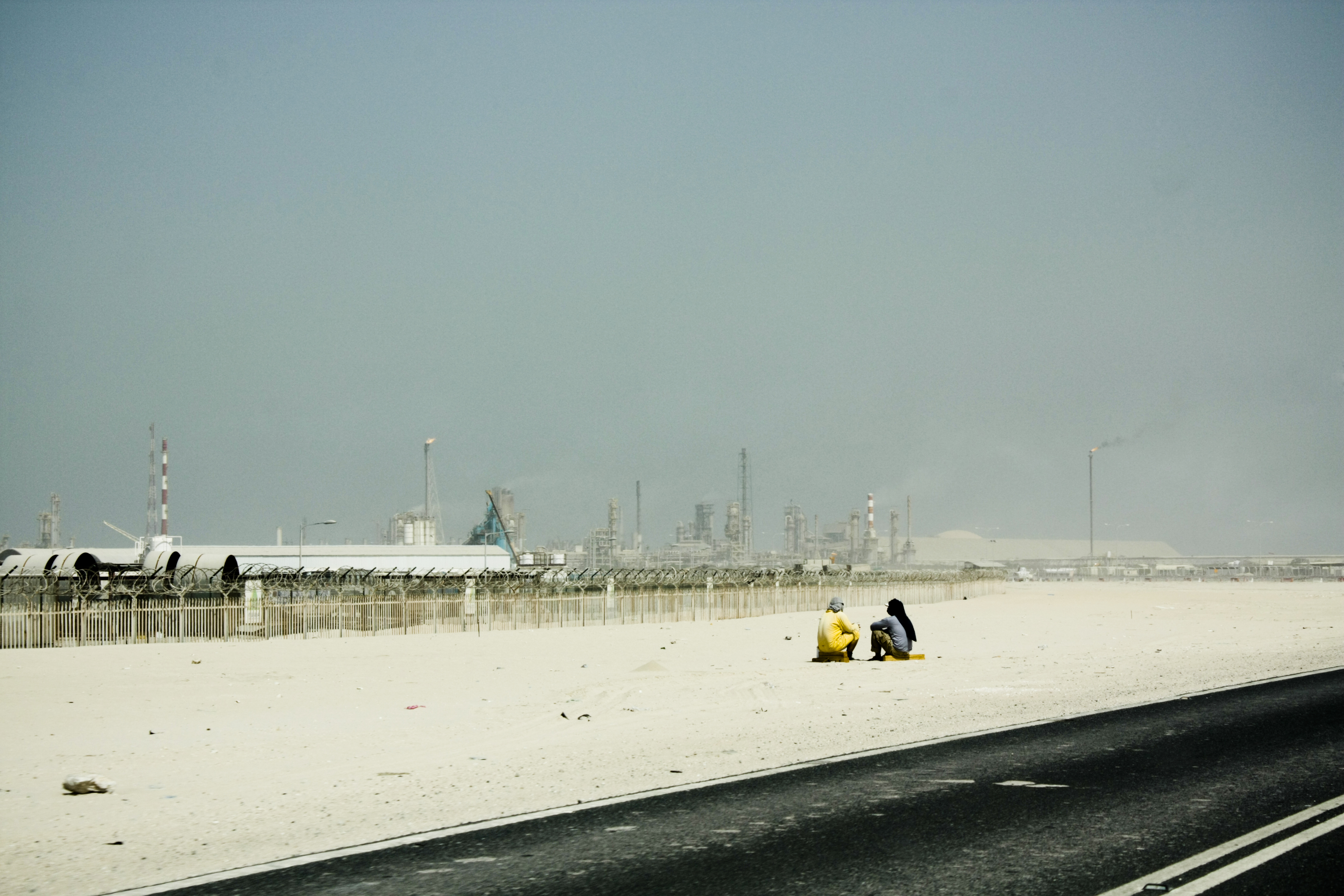
Production of natural gas in Qatar.

In 1997, Qatar began exporting LNG when it sent 5.7 billion cubic feet (160 million cubic metres) of LNG to Spain. Qatar has become the world's leading LNG exporter next to Australia. In 2009, Qatar exported nearly 1.8 trillion cubic feet (51 billion cubic metres) of LNG. Japan, South Korea, and India were the primary destinations for Qatar's LNG exports, accounting for about 57% in 2009. European markets including Belgium, the United Kingdom and Spain were also significant buyers of Qatari LNG, accounting for an additional 33%.

In 2009, Qatar produced 3.15 trillion cubic feet (89 billion cubic metres) of natural gas, three times the amount produced in 2000. Although the increase in natural-gas production fuels the growing natural-gas requirements of domestic industry and its GTL projects, the bulk of this increase is going towards LNG exports. Qatar's natural-gas consumption in 2009 was approximately 745 billion cubic feet (21.1 billion cubic metres). During 2009, Qatar exported over 2.4 trillion cubic feet (68 billion cubic metres) of natural gas, 70% of which was LNG. Qatar currently exports about 2 billion cubic feet (57 million cubic metres) of natural gas per day to the UAE and Oman through the Dolphin pipeline.

In March 2011, Qatar completed its monumental cycle of LNG infrastructure expansion with the inauguration QatarEnergy LNG N(4), Train 7 (80 billion cubic feet (2.3 billion cubic metres) per year), bringing the total capacity to 3.75 trillion cubic feet (106 billion cubic metres) per year. Qatari government officials have noted that they do not anticipate building any more LNG facilities in the near-term future, and that any additional capacity increases will be the result of improvements in the existing facilities.

In 2016, QatarEnergy has entered into an agreement with Dolphin Energy to increase exports by 1 billion cubic feet of natural gas per day. This increase if natural gas exports to UAE is responding to increase of demand in the UAE and also matches the export gas pipeline's supply capacity of 3.2 billion cubic feet per day.

In line with Qatar's plans to significantly expand natural-gas production during the next five years, the country in 2018 pledged investments worth $11.6 billion in Germany, including for the construction of a LNG terminal. QatarEnergy thereby hopes to compete with Russian LNG deliveries to Germany amid a fierce debate in the country about its dependence on Russian LNG supply.

As part of the development in Qatar's LNG sector they are planning to increase LNG production capacity. Qatar's Emir Sheikh Tamim bin Hamad al-Thani announced that the nation's LNG production capacity is set to rise to 126 million tones a year by 2027. This ambitious expansion aims to bolster Qatar's position further as a leading LNG exporter on the global stage.

In addition to the expansion of LNG production, Qatar is also focusing on environmental initiatives, particularly in carbon capture and storage (CCS). The Emir highlighted the construction of the Middle East's largest carbon capture facility, capable of isolating and storing 2.5 million tones of carbon per year within four years. By 2030, this capacity is expected to increase to 9 million tones per year.

In December 2024, threatened to halt gas supplies to the European Union if it was found to be in breach of the bloc's Corporate Sustainability Due Diligence Directive.

On March 2, 2026, on the third day of the Iran war, the Qatari Ministry of Defense announced that Ras Laffan Industrial City and Mesaieed Industrial Area were struck by two Iranian drones. QatarEnergy soon announced that it has ceased all production of natural gas and its associated products, reportedly on order by Energy Minister Saad Sherida al-Kaabi. It later announced that it was declaring Force Majeure on its contracts with buyers, and internal sources speaking to Reuters said that it would soon be shutting down gas liquefication, and that restarting it would take weeks. These announcements caused increases in world gas prices, which analysts said was a part of the Iranian government's plan to apply pressure on the world to stop the war. On March 6, al-Kaabi warned that if the war continues other Gulf energy producers may be forced to halt exports and declare Force Majeure, and that "this will bring down economies of the world". This announcement caused a jump in global oil prices.

Also on March 6, it was reported that according to satellite imagery analysis by both Bloomberg and the Energy Economics and Society Research Institute in Tokyo, Ras Laffan, the main gas facility in Qatar, appears to have not been damaged before the "unprecedented shutdown" which sent fuel prices higher.

== North Field ==
The bulk of Qatar's expected future increases in natural-gas production will come from projects related to the massive North Field. In 2005, Qatari government officials became worried that the North Field’s natural gas reserves were being developed too quickly, which could reduce pressure in the field's reservoirs and possibly damage its long-term production potential. In early 2005, the government placed a moratorium on additional natural-gas development projects at the North Field, pending the results of a study of the field's reservoirs. In April 2017, Qatar lifted the moratorium to allow new developments to begin.

In November 2005, ExxonMobil started production at the Al Khaleej block in the North Field at a rate of 750 million cubic feet per day (21×10^{6} m^{3}/d). In July 2006, the company announced a $3 billion investment to expand this output to 1.6 billion cubic feet (45×10^{6} m^{3}) per day by 2009, which fuels power plants and industrial customers in Ras Laffan Industrial City, the QatarEnergy LNG project, and as feedstock at the ORYX GTL. ExxonMobil is the largest foreign investor in Qatar's North Field. Aside from Al Khaleej, the company is also involved in increasing natural gas supplies for the QatarEnergy LNG projects, each of which will rely on significant increases in output from the North Field over the next several years (see the LNG Section below for additional details).

Qatar required foreign expertise to develop the North Field and initiate LNG production. Even though Qatar had expropriated the North Field in the late 1970s, pundits viewed it as "expropriation-lite," since Royal Dutch Shell continued to act as adviser and expert consultant. The emirate was actually anxious to grant equity stakes to international oil companies in any venture because QatarEnergy lacked the financial and technical expertise to efficiently develop the fields.

Shell, previously one of Qatar's major partners, abandoned all ongoing discussions, ostensibly lured by the promise of more-profitable gas ventures in Australia. The emirate, however, forged ahead with its plans through collaboration with QatarEnergy, BP and CFP and formed Qatargas, today QatarEnergy LNG. Moved in part by intense Japanese interest in LNG imports, the emirate tasked QatarEnergy LNG with North-Field development. Yet intermittent foreign and domestic issues have impeded this project for another decade.

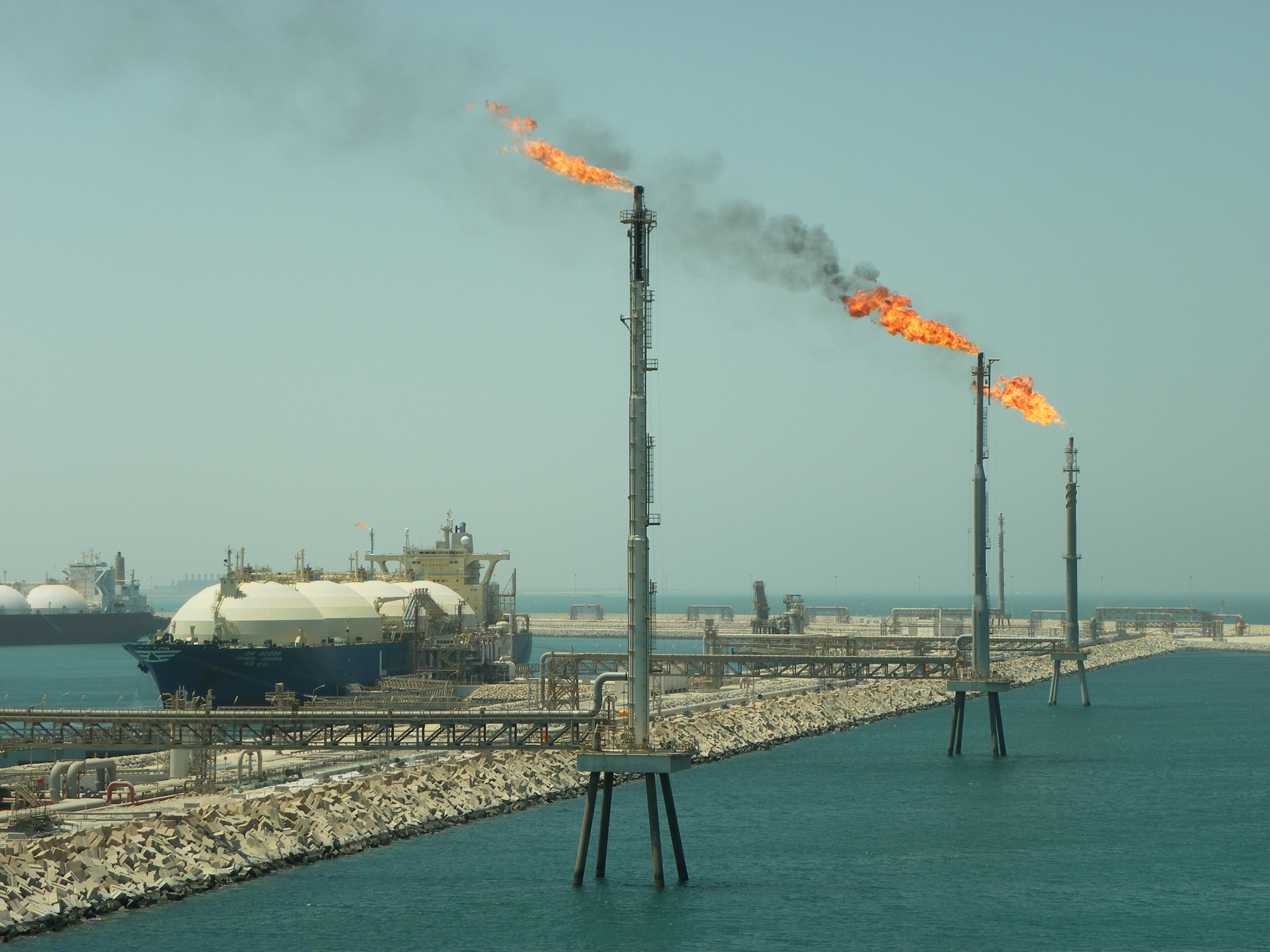
Ras Laffan LNG terminal in northern Qatar

== Gas-to-liquids ==
Gas-to-liquids (GTL) technology uses a refining process to turn natural gas into liquid fuels, such as low sulfur diesel and naphtha, among other products. GTL projects have received significant attention in Qatar over the last several years, and Qatar's government had originally set a target of developing 400,000 bbl/d (64,000 m^{3}/d) of GTL capacity by 2012. However, project cancellations and delays since the North Field reserve assessment, has substantially lowered this target. There were three big GTL projects at hand:

- Barzan Gas project and Palm GTL: The Palm project was originally slated to produce 154,000 barrels per day (24,500 m^{3}/d) of liquids for export, although estimated costs spiraled from $7 billion to $15 billion according to industry estimates. And so in February 2007, ExxonMobil announced that it had cancelled its planned Palm GTL project due to rising costs. The company will instead develop the Barzan gas project in the North Field, which is scheduled to supply 1.5 billion cubic feet (42 million cubic metres) of natural gas to Qatar’s domestic market. The Barzan field is expected to come online 2016.
- Oryx GTL: a joint-venture of QP (51%) and Sasol-Chevron GTL (49%), and has the capacity to produce 34,000 barrels per day (5,400 m^{3}/d) of liquid fuels. The plant was formally commissioned in June 2006, but technical problems prevented the consortium from loading the first export cargo until April 2007. The Oryx project uses about 330 million cubic feet (9.3 million cubic metres) per day of natural gas feedstock from the Al Khaleej field. Depending on the outcome of the North Field reservoir study, Oryx GTL may choose to expand production capacity of the plant in the future.
- Pearl GTL: In February 2007, the same week that ExxonMobil decided to cancel its GTL plans, Shell held a groundbreaking ceremony for its Pearl GTL project. The Pearl plant is 51% owned by QP, though Shell will act as the operator of the project with a 49% stake. The facility is expected to use 1.6 billion cubic feet (45 million cubic metres) of natural gas feedstock per day to produce 140,000 barrels per day (22,000 m^{3}/d) of GTL products as well as 120,000 barrels per day (19,000 m^{3}/d) of associated condensate and LPG. Pearl GTL will be developed in phases, with 70,000 barrels per day (11,000 m^{3}/d) of GTL product capacity expected by 2010 and a second phase expected in 2011. Like the Palm GTL Shell's Pearl GTL has experienced significant cost escalation. Originally estimated at $4 billion, industry sources believe Pearl GTL will now cost between $12 and $18 billion. Pearl GTL will be the first integrated GTL operation in the world, meaning it will have upstream natural gas production integrated with the onshore conversion plant.

By 2012, Qatar is likely to have 177,000 barrels per day (28,100 m^{3}/d) of GTL capacity from Oryx GTL and Pearl GTL.

== Gas to food ==
Natural gas can also be used as main raw material in the production of high protein feed for cattle, fish, or poultry with tiny water and land foot print by cultivating Methylococcus capsulatus bacteria culture. Qatar can emerge as a major food products exporter by using its cheaper natural gas. The carbon dioxide gas produced as by-product from these plants can be put to use in cheaper production of algae oil or spirulina from algaculture to mitigate green house gas (GHG) emissions.

== Natural gas project ==
The government celebrated twenty years of independence in September 1991 with the start of phase one of the North Field development project. The gas project, in a 6000 km^{2} field off Qatar's northeast coast, is supervised by Bechtel based in the United States and by Technip in France. The project marks a major step in Qatar's switch from a reliance on oil to gas for most of its revenues. The North Field is the world's largest natural gas field, and its exploitation will place Qatar in the top ranks of the world's gas producers. Natural gas from other fields provides fuel for power generation and raw materials for fertilizers, petrochemicals, and steel plants. With the expected depletion of oil reserves by about 2023, planners hope natural gas from the North Field will provide a significant underpinning for the country's economic development.

In the early 1970s, Qatar flared about 80% of the 16.8 hm³ of natural gas produced daily in association with crude oil liftings. In that decade, the country made progress in using its natural gas resources despite several setbacks. Whereas nearly 66% of onshore gas was flared in 1974, by 1979 that proportion had fallen to less than 5%.

Two natural gas liquids plants began operation in Umm Said in 1981. NGL-1 used gas produced from the Dukhan field, and NGL-2 processed gas associated with offshore fields. The combined daily capacities were 2378 tons of propane, 1840 tons of butane, 1480 tons of condensate, and 2495 tons of ethane-rich gas. However, repeated difficulties prevented the plants from coming on-line as scheduled and operating at full capacity. A massive explosion at the precursor of NGL-1 in 1977 killed six people and caused $500 million in damage. NGL-2 had problems with the pipelines that connected the plant with offshore fields. The sharp drop in oil production in the 1980s meant that lack of feedstock caused plant shutdowns and underproduction. As a result, downstream (see Glossary) users suffered as well. In 1982 the two plants produced 500,000 tons of propane and butane—slightly more than one-half of plant capacity. Condensate production lagged even further at 138,000 tons, or 40% of capacity.

This gloomy outlook is mitigated to some degree by prospective development of the massive natural gas reserves in the North Field. Discovered in 1972 by the SCQ, the proven reserves of 4.6 trillion cubic metres (160×10^{12} cu ft) (as of 1989) will be productive well into the 21st century. Qatargas was established in 1984 as a joint venture with QatarEnergy and foreign partners to market and export LNG from the North Field. Phase one of the $1.3 billion project was officially inaugurated on September 3, 1991. By the end of the month, it was pumping 23 hm³ of gas a day from sixteen wells. The production is expected to meet the domestic demand of an estimated 17 million cubic metres (600×10^{6} cu ft) per day.

QatarEnergy plans a massive development at Ras Laffan in association with the North Field project. In addition to a new port with LNG, petroleum products, and container loading berths, a methanol plant with a yearly production of 2500 tons and a petrochemical complex with an annual production of 450,000 tons are planned. The development is scheduled for completion in the late 1990s.

In line with its desire to diversify the firms engaged in developing its resources, Qatar signed a letter of intent in February 1991 with Chubu Electrical Power in Japan to supply 4 million tons per year of North Field gas for 25 years, starting in 1997. This amount represents two-thirds of QatarEnergy LNG's expected capacity of about 6 million tons per year.

== See also ==
- Dolphin Gas Project
- QatarEnergy LNG
