= Synthetic fuel commercialization =

Commercial exploitation of synthetic fuels

Worldwide commercial synthetic fuels plant capacity is over 240,000 barrels per day (38,000 m^{3}/d), including indirect conversion Fischer–Tropsch plants in South Africa (Mossgas, Secunda CTL), Qatar (Oryx GTL), and Malaysia (Shell Bintulu), and a Mobil process (Methanol to Gasoline) plant in New Zealand.

Numerous large projects are under construction in China and Qatar. Some analysts believe that Chinese CTL production will exceed that of South Africa by 2015, and new and existing GTL capacity in Qatar should also exceed the July 2009 South African production level some time in 2011.

== Existing producers ==
The leading company in the commercialization of synthetic fuel is Sasol, a company based in South Africa. Sasol operates the world's only commercial Fischer Tropsch coal-to-liquids facility, Secunda CTL, with a capacity of 150,000 barrels per day (24,000 m^{3}/d).

Sasol's Oryx Fischer Tropsch gas-to-liquids plant in Ras Laffan Industrial City, Qatar is running at 29,000 barrels per day (4,600 m^{3}/d) capacity, near its anticipated 34,000 barrels per day (5,400 m^{3}/d) nameplate capacity.

Royal Dutch Shell operates a 14,700 barrels per day (2,340 m^{3}/d) Fischer Tropsch gas-to-liquids plant in Bintulu, Malaysia.

The Mossgas gas to liquids plant in South Africa produces 45,000 barrels per day (7,200 m^{3}/d) of Fischer Tropsch synthetic fuels.

Shenhua Group completed a trial run in mid-2009, and achieved stable operation in November 2010 of their 1.08 million ton per year (roughly 22,200 barrels per day (3,530 m^{3}/d)) direct coal liquefaction plant (Erdos CTL) in Ejin Horo Banner in north China's Inner Mongolia autonomous region. Shenhua eventually intends to expand the facility to 5 million tons per year (roughly 102,000 barrels per day (16,200 m^{3}/d)). The Shenhua also expects to complete a 6 Million ton per year (3 Million TPY first phase) coal-to-fuel project using its own Fischer Tropsch indirect conversion technology next to the Inner Mongolia plant in the third quarter of 2009. In September 2011, Shenhua reported profitable operation of its new CTL plant during the first half of the year 2011. The total production of the liquid fuel during that period was 470,000 t and the cost was equivalent to ~60 USD per barrel of crude oil.

Other companies that have developed coal- or gas-to-liquids processes (at the pilot plant or commercial stage) include ExxonMobil, StatoilHydro, Rentech, and Syntroleum.

Several companies have commercially viable plastics-to-liquid-fuel plants, including Cynar PLC (UK) and Agilyx Corp. (Oregon, USA).

== Projects under construction ==
The Pearl GTL project, a joint venture of Shell and QatarEnergy, is under construction in Ras Laffan, Qatar, and will produce 140,000 barrels per day (22,000 m^{3}/d) of Fischer Tropsch petroleum liquids starting in 2011 (first train) and 2012 (second train).

The Escravos GTL project in Nigeria is expected to produce 34,000 barrels per day (5,400 m^{3}/d) of Fischer Tropsch synthetic fuel in 2013.

Yankuang expects to break ground shortly on a 22,000 barrels per day (3,500 m^{3}/d) (1 million ton per year) indirect synthetic fuels project. Final products will include 780,800 tons of diesel, 258,400 of naphtha, 56,480 of LPG.

== Proposed projects ==
=== United States ===
In the United States, a number of different synthetic fuels projects are moving forward, with the first expected to enter commercial operation starting in 2015.

Baard Energy, in its Ohio River Clean Fuels project, is developing a 53,000 barrels per day (8,400 m^{3}/d) Fischer Tropsch gas and biomass to liquids project with the carbon capture and sequestration. Pending close of a financing package, Baard hopes to begin on site preparation work before the end of 2009, with plant construction starting in 2010. Initial project startup is anticipated in 2013, with full production capacity targeted in 2015.

DKRW Advanced Fuels LLC is developing a 10,600 barrels per day (1,690 m^{3}/d) methanol to gasoline (Mobil process) coal to liquids plant with carbon capture and sequestration (through carbon dioxide enhanced oil recovery) in Medicine Bow, Wyoming. The project is expected to begin operation in 2015.

=== Germany ===
Choren Industries in Freiberg, Germany was the only operational Biomass to Liquids (BTL) demonstration plant that produces 300 barrels of Fischer Tropsch fuels per day.

=== India ===
Bioleum Resources is building India's first Biomass to Liquids plant near Pune, India.

=== Aviation fuel ===
An effort has been undertaken to certify various synthetic fuels for use in US and international aviation fleets. This is being led by an industry coalition known as the Commercial Aviation Alternative Fuels Initiative(CAAFI), also supported by a parallel initiative under way in the US Air Force to certify synthetic fuels for use in all aviation platforms. The US Air Force has certified 99% of it fleet for use with a 50/50 blend of conventional and FT Synthetic Fuel.

The CAAFI initiative has also succeeded in achieving full ASTM certification for a 50/50 blend of both FT-SPK and HEFA synthetic fuels for use in civilian aviation platforms.

On 1 February 2008, a three-hour Airbus A380 test flight operated between Britain and France, with one of four engines using a mix of 60% standard jet fuel and 40% GTL fuel supplied by Shell. The aircraft needed no modifications, Airbus said the GTL used has the same CO_{2} emissions but contains no sulphur for better air quality.

In April 2008, Sasol announced that they have achieved the first approval for 100% synthetic jet fuel use sanctioned by global aviation fuel specification authorities.

On 12 October 2009, a Qatar Airways Airbus A340-600 conducted the world's first commercial passenger flight using a mixture of kerosene and synthetic Gas-to-Liquid fuel in its flight from London's Gatwick Airport to Doha.

On 15 July 2011 Lufthansa has launched a 6-month biofuel trial on regular scheduled flights. The route selected for the test flights is Hamburg-Frankfurt-Hamburg and it will be covered by an Airbus 321 with the registration D-AIDG.

=== JBUFF (Joint Battlespace Use Fuel of the Future) fuel ===
Future blends and fuel formulations may result in a JBUFF (Joint Battlespace Use Fuel of the Future) or a single battlespace fuel that can be used in both diesel and jet fuel application. A JBUFF fuel will allow for rapid deployment and logistic enhancement for military and emergency aid environments where various types of equipment can be operated with one fuel in place of several types of fuel.

=== Initial consumers ===
In addition to their certification efforts, the United States Air Force has publicly stated their intention to fuel half of their domestic US flights with synthetic fuel by 2016. The commercial aviation industry, working with potential suppliers via CAAFI, is also pushing hard to secure sources of fuel.

The United States Department of Energy projects that domestic consumption of synthetic fuel made from coal and natural gas will rise to 3.7 million barrels per day (590×10^{3} m^{3}/d) in 2030 based on a price of $57 per barrel of high sulfur crude.

=== Non-transportation "synfuel" ===
Numerous American companies (TECO, Progress Energy, DTE Energy, Marriott) have also taken advantage of coal-based synfuel tax credits established in the 1970s, although many of the products qualifying for the subsidy are not true synthetic fuels.

The coal industry uses the credit to increase profits on coal-burning powerplants by introducing a "pre-treatment" process that satisfies the technical requirements, then burns the result the same as it would burn coal. Sometimes the amount gained in the tax credit is a major factor in the economic operation of the plant. The synfuel tax credit has been used primarily in this manner since the cheap gas prices of the 1980s stopped any major efforts to create a transportation fuel with the credit, and its continuation is seen as a major "pork project" win for coal industry lobbyists, costing $9 billion per annum. The total production of such synfuels in the United States was an estimated 73 million tons in 2002.

The synthetic fuel tax credit, Section 45K, under which these activities occurred, expired 31 December 2007.
