= List of power stations in Qatar =

Location of power stations in Qatar: gas

The following is a list of the power stations in Qatar.

== Gas ==
Name	Location	Capacity (MW)	Commissioned	Refs
Al Arish	Al `Arish	8.5 (at commission date)	1975	
Mesaieed	Mesaieed Industrial Area	2007	2008–2010	
Qatalum	Mesaieed Industrial Area	1350	2011	
Ras Abu Fontas A	Ras Abu Fontas	626	1977,1993,1997	
Ras Abu Fontas B	Ras Abu Fontas	609 or 625	1995–1996	
Ras Laffan A	Ras Laffan Industrial City	756	2003	
Ras Laffan B	Ras Laffan Industrial City	1025	2006–2008	
Ras Laffan C	Ras Laffan Industrial City	2730	2010–2011	
Saliyah	Al Sailiya	134	1983	

== See also ==
- Energy in Qatar
- List of largest power stations in the world
