= 2026 Ras Laffan explosion =

Disaster in Qatar

- Barzan gas plant
- Date: 21 June 2026
- Location: Barzan plant, Ras Laffan Industrial City, Qatar
- Cause: Technical accident
- Deaths: 13
- Injuries: 66

On 21 June 2026, an explosion occurred at the Ras Laffan Industrial City in Qatar, killing at least 13 people and injuring 66 others. The incident took place at the Barzan gas processing plant while operations were ongoing to restart production halted due to maintenance. The cause of the explosion was attributed to a technical accident, with energy minister Saad Sherida al-Kaabi ruling out sabotage. All of the dead were foreign nationals, 12 out of the 13 being Indian nationals.

== Background ==
The Ras Laffan Industrial City is key to the economy of Qatar and its energy sector, serving as the world's largest liquefied natural gas (LNG) production and export center, being responsible for a fifth of the world's supply. Ras Laffan contains the Barzan facility, which does not produce LNG. The plant can produce 1.4 billion cubic feet of sales gas a day, and supplies gas for local industry and energy generation while being able to produce liquefied petroleum gas. During the 2026 Iran war, Iranian attacks hit Ras Laffan, halting 17% of Qatar's LNG exports and causing damage that would take years to fix. However, the facility's production was intentionally shut down as early as December 2025 due to maintenance and was restarted two days before the explosion.

== Explosion ==
In the late evening, an explosion occurred at the Barzan gas plant and was felt throughout central Doha, rattling windows and causing panic 70 kilometers from Ras Laffan. A reporter for Agence France-Presse 20 km (12 mi) from the incident also reported fire and smoke rising from the area. QatarEnergy later confirmed that an operational accident caused an explosion while work was underway at the Barzan gas supply facility to restore the plant’s operations. The blast sparked a large fire that was later contained by emergency services. The extent of the damage was not revealed.

The Qatari Interior Ministry attributed the explosion to a "technical accident", adding that no hazardous leaks occurred. Energy minister Saad Sherida al-Kaabi later reiterated this conclusion, ruling out sabotage or hostile action. He added that an investigation was ongoing, and that the explosion would not impact the facility's export capabilities or the environment.

== Casualties ==
Al Kaabi said that the explosion killed 13 workers and injured 66 others, adding that none of the injured were in life-threatening condition. Twelve of the dead were confirmed by the Indian embassy in Doha to have been Indian nationals, while one was Pakistani. Additionally, Qataris, Indians, Pakistanis, Tanzanians, Guineans, Nepalese, Bangladeshis, Kenyans, and Nigerians were injured. Earlier, the Qatari International Search and Rescue Group of the Lekhwiya and civil defense services were searching for 18 missing citizens.

On 25 June, the bodies of four Indians were being repatriated to India.
