= Energy in Qatar =

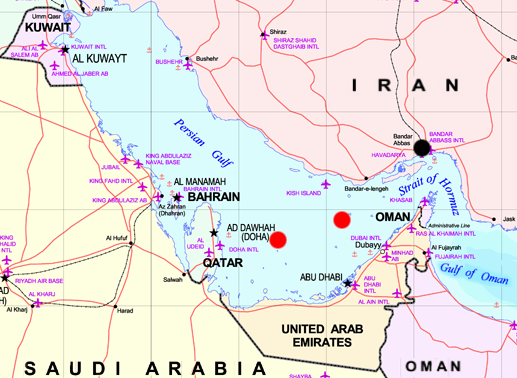
Location

In 2014, oil and natural gas production made up 51.1% of Qatar's nominal GDP.

Qatar was a member of the Organization of the Petroleum Exporting Countries (OPEC) until their departure on January 1, 2019 due to a desire to increase autonomy from neighbors in the Persian Gulf following poor relations. Since 2007, natural gas production in Qatar has significantly increased and is the primary fuel chosen for energy consumption within Qatar. In 2014, Qatar ranked as the fourth highest natural gas producer worldwide. In 2024, Qatar consumed about 53 billion kWh of electricity.

== Crude oil ==
Qatar's exploration of the oil market began around 1923, when its own pearl diving market took a hit with the entry of Japan's cultivated pearls into the market. Qatar's first oil discovery was made in late 1930s with oil deposits found in Dukhan field. Since then, Qatar claims to have 1.5% of global oil reserves, while producing 2% of the global oil economy.

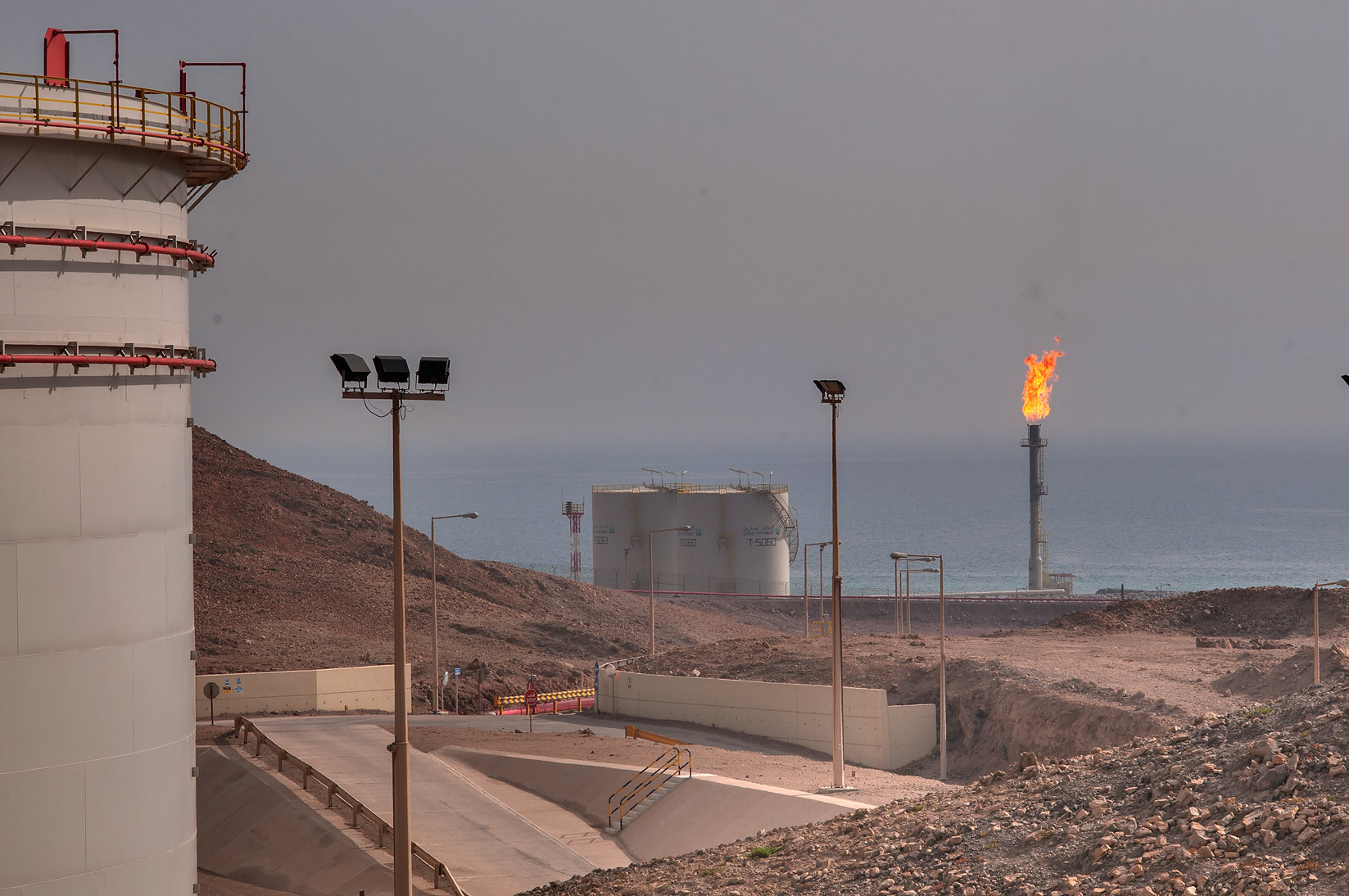
Oil storage tanks on Halul Island

In 2015, Qatar was ranked as the 17th top producer of crude oil worldwide at an approximate 1.532 million bbl/day. In 2013, Qatar also ranked as the 11th top exporter of crude oil at an approximate 1.303 million bbl/day. With high production of crude oil, Qatar is one of the few countries that has little crude oil dependence on other countries for domestic energy consumption. While Qatar does not import any crude oil, it does, however, import approximately 2,555 bbl/day of refined petroleum products. The following table depicts how much oil each sector of Qatar's economy consumes in 1000 tonnes in the year 2014, notice how all of the oil products used in Qatar are from refined petroleum sources.

Qatar Oil Consumption by Economic Sector in 2014 (in 1000 tons)
| | Liquefied Petroleum Gases | Motor Gasoline | Gas/Diesel |
|---|---|---|---|
| Residential | 113 | 0 | 0 |
| Transport | 0 | 1676 | 2792 |
| Non- Energy Use | 749 | 0 | 0 |

The sectors of the economy which consume the most of oil - based fuels for energy usage are transport and residential. This is due to Qatar's limited resources related to agriculture, forestry, and fishing since it has primarily desert terrain. And while oil consumption for energy usage has quadrupled since 2000, the proportions for which each sector consumes oil has been consistent.

=== Development strategy ===
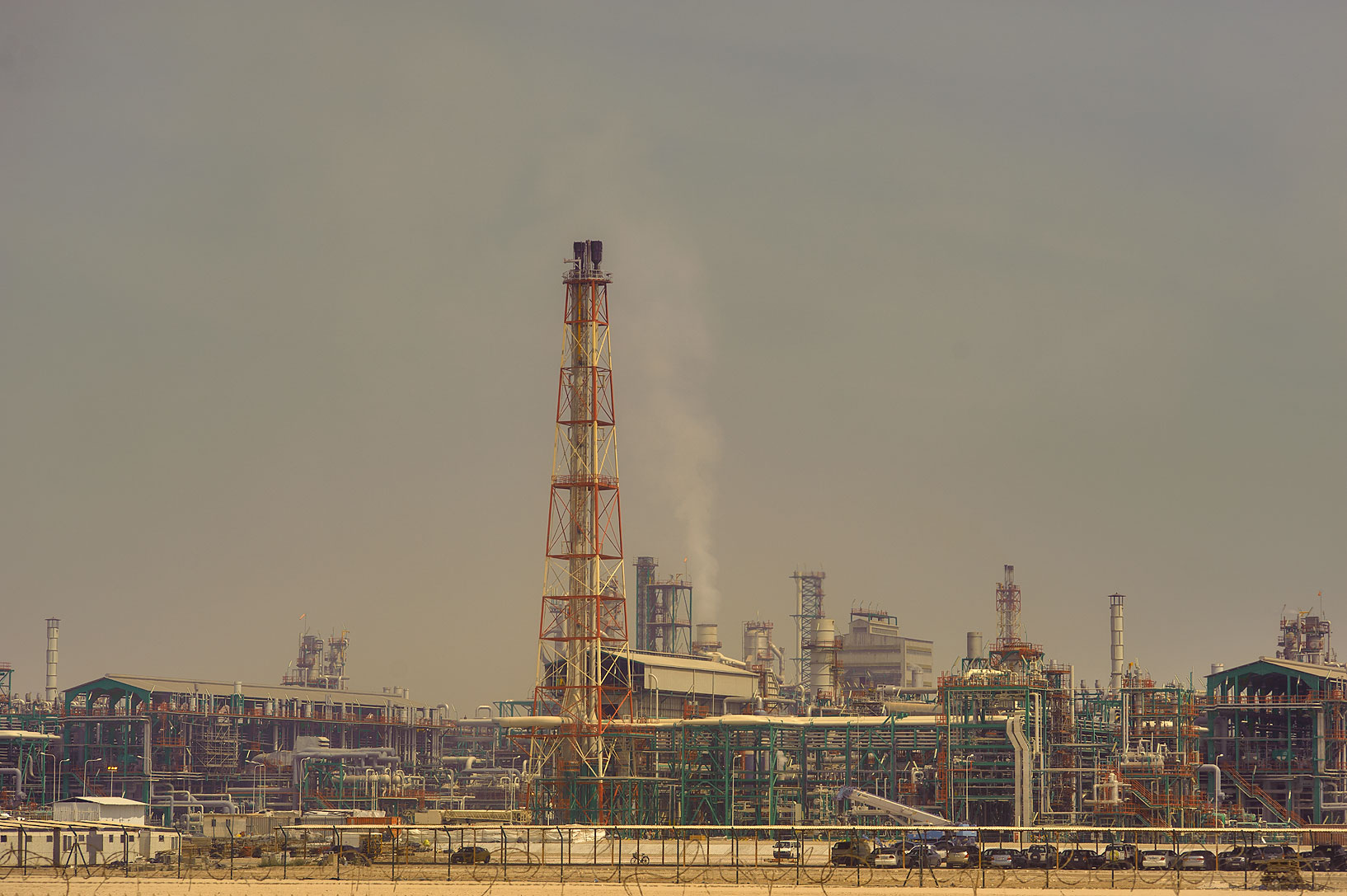
Petrochemical plant in Mesaieed Industrial Area.

Qatar has a high economic dependency on the global oil and natural gas market with 51% of its nominal GDP coming from oil and gas exports in 2014. An indirect result of the instability of oil prices within the most recent decades has led the Qatari government to develop the Qatar National Development Strategy 2011–2016 (Development Strategy) as an efficient strategy to achieve the Qatar National Vision 2030.

In the Development Strategy, there are four pillars, one of which, the economy pillar, discusses policies, regulations, and political motives related to Qatar’s dependence on oil. For sustaining economic prosperity, Qatar aims to:

1. enlarge the value of its productive base,
2. guard against economic instability and promote increased efficiency, and
3. diversify the economy and encourage a culture of innovation and discovery.

These objectives were created under the notion that Qatar's hydrocarbon income will continue to decrease in response to the increase in renewable energy technologies and depletion of oil resources.

An enlargement of its productive base (hydrocarbon and mineral assets) by investing in physical and social infrastructure effectively attracts tourists and expatriates to the area, and provides better roads and housing for citizens as well. However, constant construction in Qatar for improving and creating physical infrastructure has caused frustration within the population throughout the process.

The government's gradual transition to a more stable economy while maintaining the wealth of the nation primarily comes at a cost to Qatar’s government since hydrocarbon assets are property of the State. However, should the government not cautiously or properly invest for the new economy, the population would lose their current standard of living and the cost would be primarily directed at them.

The government plans to attack inefficiency in technology, physical infrastructure, institutions and processes in order to make a lasting contribution to improve the use of resources over time. Since Qatar is primarily desert terrain, there exists restrictions on how Qatar can expand its productive base and thus, most of the Development Strategy is focused on increasing efficiency of all current physical and social structures put into place. In particular, there is a plan to tackle technical and economic inefficiencies in the production, distribution and use of water.

As of 2017, a more diversified economy is inherently more stable, more capable of creating jobs and opportunities for the next generation and less vulnerable to the boom and bust cycles of oil and natural gas prices in Qatar. However, Qatar has still not published a plan for which they state how they will achieve this diversified economy. Thus, the effectiveness of such a plan cannot be commented on until such a plan is produced for public consumption.

Ease of political acceptability on the Development Strategy is dependent on the residents' acceptance of the current government as proven with other laws in the past. Qatar aims to set itself apart on the international stage with its plans to diversify its oil - based economy and improve inefficiencies within social and physical structures of the State.

== Natural gas ==
In 2009 Qatar was the 7th top producer of natural gas (2.9%) in the world, exceeding Algeria (2.6%), the Netherlands (2.5%) and Indonesia (2.5%). 75% of the natural gas production was exported in 2009 (67/89 bm^{3}). The energy content is high.

== Solar power ==
Harnessing solar power has become an important objective for Qatar in recent years. By 2030, Qatar has set the goal of attaining 20% of its energy from solar power. The country is well-positioned to capitalize on photovoltaic systems, as it has a global horizontal irradiance value of approximately 2,140 kWh per square meter annually. Furthermore, the direct irradiance parameter is roughly 2,008 kWh per square meter annually, implying that it would be able to benefit from concentrated solar power as well.

Qatar Foundation has been active in helping Qatar achieve its solar power goals. It established Qatar Solar, which, together with Qatar Development Bank and German company SolarWorld, embarked on a joint venture resulting in the creation of Qatar Solar Technologies (QSTec). In 2017, QSTec commissioned its polysilicon plant in Ras Laffan. This plant has a total capacity of 1.1 MW of solar power.

Qatar signed a deal with Total and Marubeni in January 2020 to build a solar power plant that could produce 800 megawatts of electricity. The plant was built in Al Kharsaah at a cost of $467 million and was completed in 2022.

== Electricity ==
Qatar electricity production by year

Qatar's electricity supply is regulated by Kahramaa.

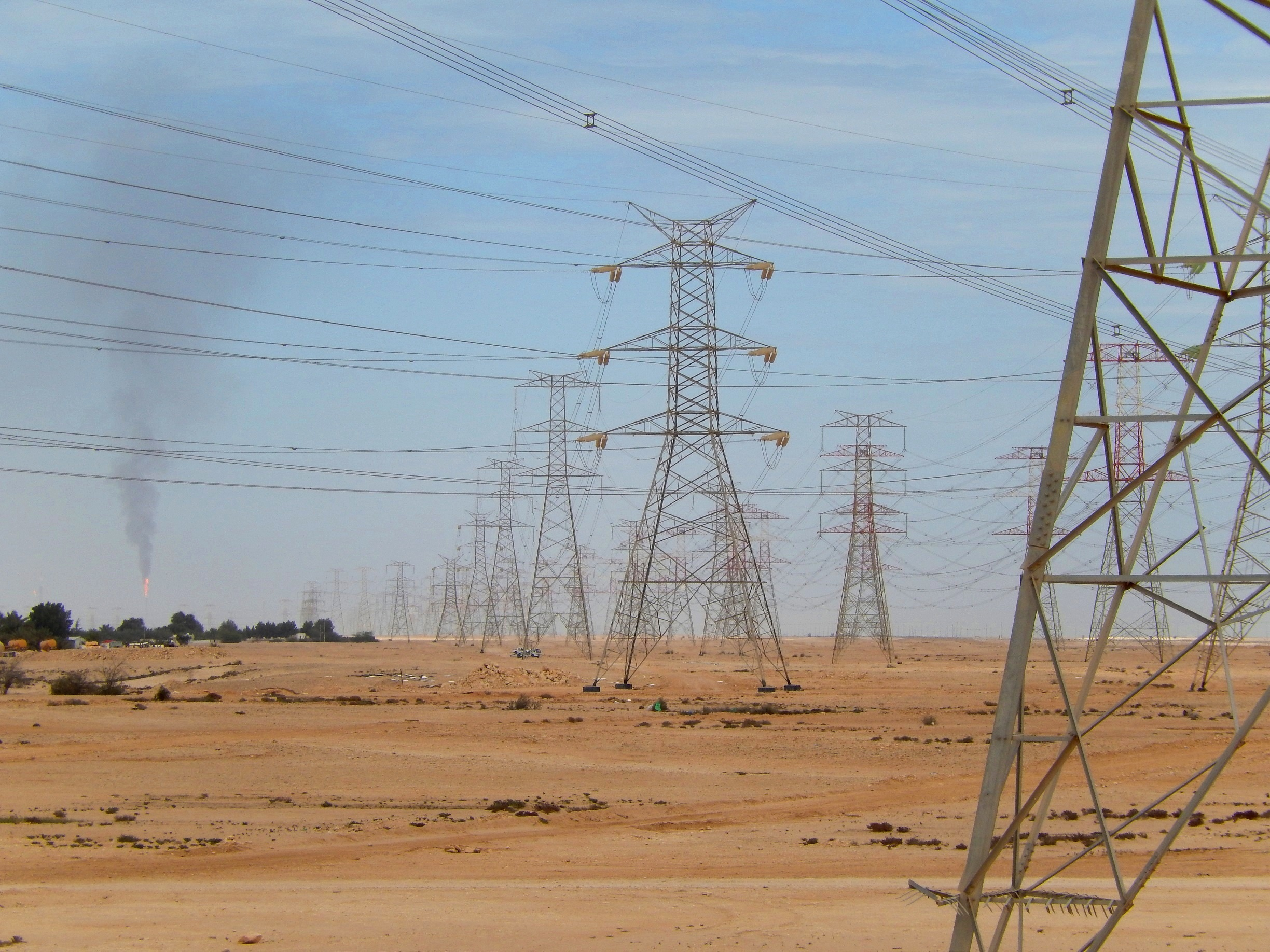
Overhead power lines in Qatar. A gas flare of a refinery can be seen in the distance.

Energy in Qatar
| | Capita | Prim. energy | Production | Export | Electricity | CO_{2}-emission |
| | million | TWh | TWh | TWh | TWh | Mt |
|---|---|---|---|---|---|---|
| 2004 | 0.78 | 210 | 883 | 667 | 12.3 | 38.6 |
| 2007 | 0.84 | 258 | 1,198 | 930 | 14.7 | 48.5 |
| 2008 | 1.28 | 281 | 1,452 | 1,161 | 20.1 | 53.9 |
| 2009 | 1.41 | 277 | 1,628 | 1,338 | 23.0 | 56.5 |
| 2010 | 1.76 | 262 | 2,025 | 1,748 | 26.4 | 66.1 |
| 2012 | 1.87 | 387 | 2,457 | 2,043 | 30.1 | 71.4 |
| 2012R | 2.05 | 441 | 2,563 | 2,103 | 32.6 | 75.8 |
| 2013 | 2.17 | 467 | 2,605 | 2,109 | 32.5 | 72.4 |
| Change 2004-10 | 126% | 25% | 129% | 162% | 114% | 71% |
Mtoe = 11.63 TWh. 2012R = CO2 calculation criteria changed, numbers updated

From 2007 to 2010 energy export of Qatar have increased from 930 TWh to 1,748 TWh. In three years population growth was from 0.84 million to 1.76 million persons.

== Global warming ==
Qatar was the third top carbon dioxide emitter per capita in the world in 2009: 79.82 tonnes per capita. All emissions from building and cement production are local but some people may argue that some Qatar produced fuels and goods are consumed abroad.

== See also ==
- Oil megaprojects (2011)
