= Nakilat Damen Shipyards Qatar =

Nakilat Damen Shipyards Qatar (NDSQ) is a Qatar-based shipyard established in 2010 in a joint venture between Nakilat and Damen Group.

== Overview ==
NDSQ was established in November 2010 with its base of operations situated at the 15-hectare shipyard Erhama Bin Jaber Al Jalahma Shipyard near Ras Laffan. Its inception came as a result of an agreement reached between Nakilat and Damen Group in January 2010 wherein the two companies agreed to launch a joint venture company with 70% and 30% ownership, respectively. Materials used to build ships include steel, aluminum and fibre-reinforced plastic. Vessels are built with a maximum length of 170m.

== Shipbuilding activities ==
NDSQ's first vessel was completed in September 2012. Named Load Out/Recovery Barge, the vessel was 140m long and weighed 6,500 tonnes. It had a maximum lifting capacity of 13,000 tonnes.

In January 2013, NDSQ built the largest-ever constructed vessel in Qatar, a 140m barge named Al Ghatrousah. Its name was revealed by energy minister Mohammed Saleh Al Sada in a ceremony at Erhama Bin Jaber Al Jalahma Shipyard.

In March 2013, the company reported that it would be constructing Qatar's first-ever luxury yacht, measuring 69m in length. The completion date was estimated to be in 2016.

Two memoranda of understanding were signed by the NDSQ in March 2014 stipulating the construction of seven vessels for the Qatar Armed Forces. The deal was reportedly valued at QAR 3.1 billion.

By November 2015, it was reported that Nakilat-Damen had built or was in the process of building in excess of 40 vessels.
