= Ras Qartas Energy Plant =

Power generation and water desalination plant in Qatar

Rasgirtas Power station
- Country: Qatar
- Location: Ras Laffan Industrial City
- Coordinates: 25°56′13″N 51°31′20″E
- Status: Operational
- Construction began: 2009
- Commission date: 2011
- Construction cost: US$3.9 billion
- Owners: QEWC; QatarEnergy
- Operator: Ras Girtas Power Company

Thermal power station
- Primary fuel: Natural gas
- Combined cycle?: Yes
- IWPP?: Yes

Power generation
- Units operational: 12
- Make and model: Mitsubishi Heavy Industries
- Nameplate capacity: 2,730 MW
- Annual net output: 10,645,852 MW h (2018)

External links
- Website: www.rasgirtas.qa

Ras Girtas Power Company (also known as Ras Laffan C power and desalination plant) is a power generation and water desalination plant located in Ras Laffan Industrial City, Qatar. It has installed capacity of 2,730 MW, which include eight gas turbines and four steam turbines by Mitsubishi Heavy Industries. The foundation stone of the plant was officially laid on 4 May 2009. The plant was commissioned on 31 May 2011 in the presence of the emir, Sheikh Hamad bin Khalifa Al-Thani, and it cost US$3.9 billion. Once fully operational, the plant will produce 286,000 cubic metres per day (10,100,000 cu ft/d) of desalinated water. It uses ten multi-effect distillation/thermal vapour compression units built by Sidem.

The plant is operated by Ras Girtas Power Company, and it is owned by Qatar Electricity & Water Company (45%), QatarEnergy (15%), GDF Suez (through International Power, 20%), Mitsui & Co. (10%), Chubu Electric Power (5%), and Shikoku Electric Power Company (5%).
