= Ibe Kachikwu =

Nigerian politician and engineer

Minister of State for Petroleum Resources
- In office 11 November 2015 – 29 May 2019
- Preceded by: Diezani Alison-Madueke
- Succeeded by: Timipre Sylva

Group Managing Director of the Nigerian National Petroleum Corporation
- In office August 2015 – 4 July 2016
- Preceded by: Joseph Thlama Dawha
- Succeeded by: Maikanti Baru

President of OPEC
- In office December 2015 – December 2015
- Preceded by: Diezani Alison-Madueke
- Succeeded by: Mohammed Saleh Al Sada

Personal details
- Born: Emmanuel Ibe Kachikwu; 18 December 1956 (age 69) Onicha-Ugbo, British Nigeria (now Delta State, Nigeria)
- Spouse: Elizabeth Kachikwu
- Children: 3
- Education: Harvard University and University of Nigeria, Nsukka
- Website: ibekachikwu.com

Emmanuel Ibe Kachikwu // (born 18 December 1956) is a Nigerian politician and lawyer who served as the Minister of State for Petroleum Resources and former Group Managing Director of the Nigerian National Petroleum Corporation. He was replaced by Timipre Sylva who took over the ministerial portfolio in August 2019.

== Education ==
Kachikwu is a graduate of law from the University of Nigeria, Nsukka and Nigerian Law School. He obtained a masters and doctorate degree in law from Harvard University, with distinctions.

== Career ==
=== Media enterprise ===
In 1989, Kachikwu went into romance journalism, a genre that explores romantic tales and relationship issues across the country. This was done through the unveil of Hints magazine, a weekly publication by his media enterprise, "True Tales Publications Limited". Kachikwu readily connected to a wide audience via his weekly column, ‘Fatherhood with Ibe,’ where he shared with his readers his experiences as a father. In 2013, Kachikwu's True Tales Publications Limited launched ‘Hello Nigeria,’ a lifestyle magazine. The maiden edition of the magazine featured icons in music, film, fashion, culture and style, drawn from Nigeria and Ghana.

=== NNPC ===
He was appointed as chief executive of the Nigerian National Petroleum Corporation in August 2015 under the presidency of Muhammadu Buhari. On 11 November 2015, Kachikwu was named the Minister of State, Petroleum Resources by the president. He was named as the chairman of the board of the Nigerian National Petroleum Corporation, as provided for under Section 1(2) of the Nigerian National Petroleum Corporation Act of 1997, as amended on 4 July 2016.

He was removed as the GMD of the NNPC by President Muhammadu Buhari and replaced with Dr. Maikanti K. Baru on 4 July 2016.

=== OPEC ===
He is the immediate past president of the OPEC conference with a tenure that expired in January 2016. He has chaired the 168th Meeting of the OPEC Conference held in Vienna, Austria, on 4 December 2015, as its President. He was replaced by Mohammed Saleh Al Sada, the Minister of Energy and Industry of Qatar.
