= Mohammed Saleh Al Sada =

Qatari politician

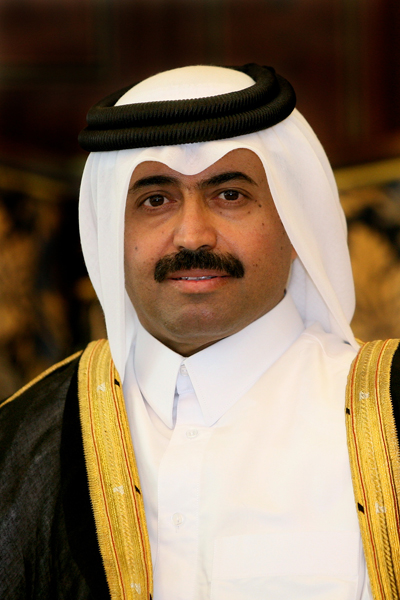

Minister of Energy and Industry
- In office 18 January 2011 – 2018
- Prime Minister: Hamad bin Jassim Al Thani; Abdullah bin Nasser Al Thani
- Preceded by: Abdullah bin Hamad Al Attiyah
- Succeeded by: Saad Sherida al-Kaabi

President of OPEC
- Incumbent
- Assumed office 7 December 2015
- Preceded by: Emmanuel Ibe Kachikwu

Personal details
- Education: Qatar University
- Alma mater: Qatar University; UMIST

Mohammed Saleh Abdullah Al Sada is a Qatari politician and former minister of energy and industry and the chairman of Qatar Petroleum.

== Education ==
Sada graduated from Qatar University with a Bachelor of Science degree in earth science. He also holds a MSc and a PhD from the University of Manchester Institute of Science and Technology.

== Career ==
Al Sada started his career at Qatar Petroleum in 1983. He served in various positions and was appointed as technical director of Qatar Petroleum in 1997. From 2006 to 2011 he served as the managing director of RasGas liquefied natural gas company. He is also the vice chairman of the board of the Qatar Chemical Company (Q-Chem) and Qatar Steel Company (QASCO), and the chairman of the board of directors of Qatar Metals Coating Company (Q-Coat). He has served as a member of Qatar's permanent constitution preparation committee, the supreme education council, and the national committee for human rights.

In April 2007, Al Sada was appointed minister of state for energy and industry affairs and served in that position until 2011.

On 18 January 2011, he replaced Abdullah bin Hamad Al Attiyah in the post of minister of industry and energy. On 14 February 2011, he was appointed as chairman of the board and managing director of Qatar Petroleum. He held the position as managing director at Qatar Petroleum until 2014 and was chairman of the board until 2018. On 24 February 2011, he became the chairman of the RasGas's board of directors.

Al Sada remained unchanged in the cabinet reshuffle in June 2013, which saw the change of the prime minister. Therefore, he was part of the cabinet led by prime minister Abdullah bin Nasser bin Khalifa Al Thani.

Al Sada was chairman of Nakilat (Qatar Gas Transport Company). He was succeeded by Saad Sherida al-Kaabi. He also was board chairman of the Qatar Electricity and Water Company.

From 2017 to 2022 Al Sada was the chairman of the Qatar University Alumni Association.

Al Sada is chairman of the Joint Advisory Board at Texas A&M University Qatar and chairman of the board of trustees of the University of Doha for Science and Technology.

In July 2023, Al Sada was elected as chairman of the board of directors for the Russian Oil company Rosneft.

Al Sada is the president of the Dadu Children’s Museum advisory committee.

== Personal life ==
Al Sada is married and has two daughters and three sons.

== Honors ==
- Grand Cordon of the Order of the Rising Sun (2020)
