= Dolphin Energy =

Gas company

- Company type: Subsidiary
- Industry: Oil and gas
- Founded: 1999; 27 years ago
- Founder: Government of Abu Dhabi
- Headquarters: Abu Dhabi, United Arab Emirates
- Key people: Sheikh Hamdan Bin Zayed Al Nahyan (chairman); Obaid Al Dhaheri (CEO)
- Parent: Mubadala Investment Company
- Website: www.dolphinenergy.com

Dolphin Energy is a gas company of Abu Dhabi, United Arab Emirates. It was established in March 1999 by the Government of Abu Dhabi. As of today, Dolphin Energy is owned by Mubadala Investment Company, on behalf of the Government of Abu Dhabi, (51% of shares), Total S.A. (24.5%) and Occidental Petroleum (24.5%). It also has operations based in Doha, Qatar.

== Dolphin Gas Project ==
Dolphin Energy's Dolphin Gas Project, involves the production and processing of natural gas from Qatar's North Field, and transportation of the gas by offshore pipeline to the United Arab Emirates and Oman. In July 2007, the company announced it began production of gas from Qatar's North Field. The gas is processed at the Gas Processing Plant in Qatar's Ras Laffan Industrial City and then transported to the refined methane by sub-sea export pipeline from Qatar to Dolphin Energy's Gas Receiving Facilities at Taweelah in Abu Dhabi.

Today, 2 billion standard cubic feet of natural gas a day is delivered to the UAE and Oman, supporting power generation, water desalination and industrial development. It is also a subsidiary based in Doha, Qatar.
