= Escravos GTL =

Escravos GTL is a gas to liquids (GTL) project based in Escravos region, Nigeria. It is located in the Niger Delta about 100 kilometres (62 mi) southeast of Lagos. The plant converts natural gas into liquid petroleum products.

== History ==
A pre-feasibility study of Escravos GTL was conducted in April 1998, followed by an engineering feasibility study. The Front-End Engineering and Design (FEED) was completed in 2002. At the same year, agreements between Sasol, Chevron Corporation and Nigerian National Petroleum Company were signed. The construction contract was awarded in April 2005 to a consortium of JGC, KBR and Snamprogetti.

== Description ==
The GTL plant cost US$10 billion and started up in summer 2014; its original cost started out at US$1.9 billion in 2005, rising to US$5.9 billion in 2009 but continued to escalate. It has an initial capacity of 34,000 barrels per day (5,400 m^{3}/d) of synfuel. The plant uses the Fischer–Tropsch process technology and Chevron's ISOCRACKING technology.

More than 325 million cubic feet of natural gas are converted daily by the Escravos GTL facility into GTL diesel and GTL naphtha. The CNL Escravos Gas facility Phase I (EGP-1) and the GTL facility are next to each other.

== Partners ==
The project was developed by Chevron Nigeria Limited (75%) and the Nigerian National Petroleum Company (15%). Sasol gained interest in the project early on, acquiring half of Chevron Nigeria's stake; however, due to increased cost and delays, Sasol reduced its stake to 10% in late 2008.
