= Pearl GTL =

Gas to liquids plant based in Ras Laffan, Qatar

Coordinates: 25°54′18″N 51°30′19″E

General information
- Type: Gas to liquids plant
- Location: Ras Laffan, Qatar
- Cost: $18 billion
- Owner: QatarEnergy; Royal Dutch Shell

Pearl GTL is a gas to liquids (GTL) plant based in Ras Laffan, Qatar. It converts natural gas into a range of liquid hydrocarbon products, including naphtha, kerosene, normal paraffins, gas oil and base oils. It is the largest GTL plant in the world. The first commercial shipment from the Pearl GTL was made on 13 June 2011. The project is a Production Sharing Agreement (PSA) between QatarEnergy and Shell. Pearl GTL received the 2021 "Asset of the Year" award by Shell.

== Technical features ==
The Pearl GTL can convert 1.6 billion cubic feet per day (45×10^{6} m^{3}/d) of natural gas into 140,000 barrels per day (22,000 m^{3}/d) of petroleum liquids and 120,000 barrels of oil equivalent (730,000 GJ) into natural gas liquids and ethane.

The primary products of the plant are naphtha and transport fuels, with paraffins and lubricant oils as smaller by-products of the process. The transport fuel can be used in existing light and heavy diesel engines and has been shown to have a number of benefits, such as lower emissions and engine performance enhancement.

== Project ==
The Pearl GTL project built upon the foundations of Shell's smaller scale GTL project in Bintulu, Malaysia, which has been in operation since 1993. The core of the plant is a set of 24 reactors where the Fischer–Tropsch process is carried out.

The main contractors were KBR and JGC Corporation. Other contractors were J. Ray McDermott, CB&I, Consolidated Contractors Company, Kentz, Descon Engineering Limited. The process pumps are supplied by Flowserve, chemical injection pumps are by LEWA Germany and eight turbomachinery trains for use in the air separation systems are supplied by Linde. Oxygen production capacity is 28,800 t/day. Half of the Fischer-Tropsch reactors were supplied by MAN AG. The waste water treatment plant can treat 300,000 barrels per day, equivalent to the output of a million-people city.

The integrated process automation and control system for the main plant and the onplot tank farm were designed and implemented by Honeywell, while that for the offplot tank farm and the loading berths were designed and implemented by Invensys. Page Europa was contracted as overall Telecom System Integrator for both onshore and offshore telecommunications systems. ABB Group was contracted to supply all of the electrical and control systems. The first train started production in May 2011, followed by the second train in November 2011.

The plant reached full production in mid-2012.

== Economics ==
In 2003, the project cost was estimated to be US$5 billion. However, after facing huge cost escalation, it was reported to be $18 billion in 2007, and, according to QatarEnergy sources, final project cost is expected to reach as high as $24 billion. Because Shell's contract provided them with the input gas for free, the project was calculated to be viable once the price of oil exceeded $40 per barrel.

== 2026 Iran War ==
One of the two production lines of the facility was damaged by a missile strike during the 2026 Iranian strikes on Qatar, which were part of the Iran War. It was estimated that repairing the damaged line would take at least a year. The plant remained shut down for six months due to the closure of the Strait of Hormuz. In October 2026, its undamaged line was temporarily restarted "to build a limited amount of product inventory in storage".
