= Oryx GTL =

Synthetic fuel plant in Ras Laffan Industrial City, Qatar

ORYX GTL Limited
- Founder: QatarEnergy; Sasol Middle East & India
- Headquarters: Doha, Qatar
- Key people: Sh. Thani T Al Thani (CEO)
- Website: www.oryxgtl.qa

ORYX GTL (Arabic: أوريكس جي تي إل) is a synthetic fuel plant based in Ras Laffan Industrial City, Qatar, owned by QatarEnergy (51%) and Sasol (49%). It uses gas to liquids (GTL) technology for converting natural gas into liquid petroleum products. The capacity of Oryx GTL in 2007 was 34 thousand barrels per day (5.4×10^{3} m^{3}/d) of oil.

== History ==
Construction of the plant started in 2003. The plant began production in 2007.
