= Ras Laffan Industrial City =

Ras Laffan رأس لفان
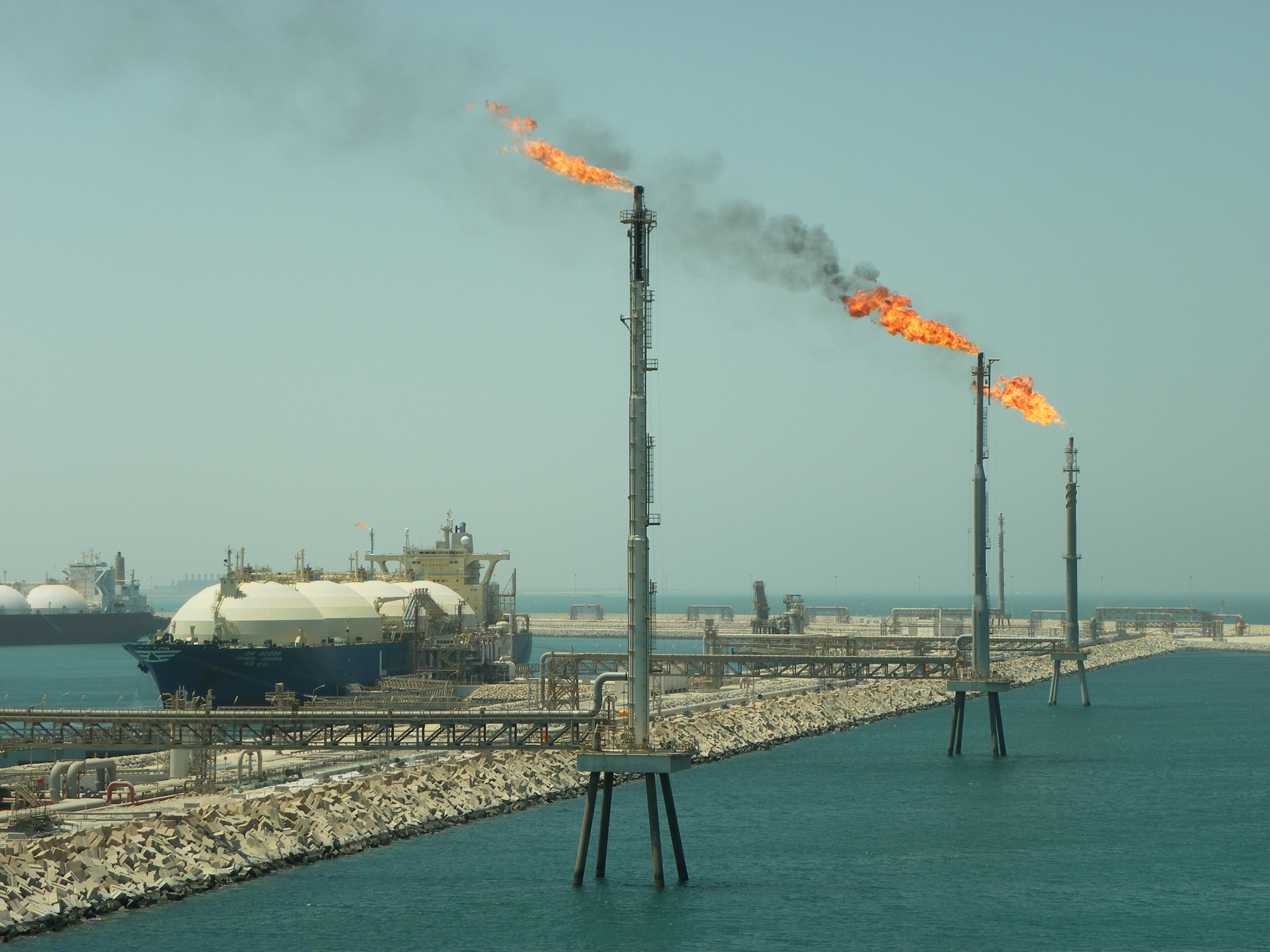
- An LNG terminal in Ras Laffan in 2012

- Location within Qatar
- Coordinates: 25°51′27″N 51°32′20″E
- Country: Qatar
- Municipality: Al Khor
- Zone: Zone 75
- District no.: 312
- Established: 1996

Area
  - Total: 55.5 km^{2} (21.4 sq mi)

Population (2017)
  - Total: 30,000
  - Density: 540/km^{2} (1,400/sq mi)

Ras Laffan Industrial City (Arabic: رأس لفان, romanized: Ra’s Lafān) is a Qatari industrial hub located 80 kilometres (50 mi) north of Doha. It is administered by QatarEnergy.

Ras Laffan Industrial City is Qatar's main site for production of liquefied natural gas and gas-to-liquid. It hosts among others ORYX GTL and Pearl GTL plants, QatarEnergy LNG plants, and the Dolphin gas processing plant, the Laffan Refinery, and Ras Laffan A, B, and C integrated water and power plants. With an enclosed water area of approximately 4,500 ha (11,000 acres), Ras Laffan Port is the largest artificial harbour in the world and contains the world's largest LNG export facility, capable of exporting 15 million tons of liquids per year.

== Etymology ==
In Arabic, the term ras translates as "head" and refers to a cape, whereas laffan is derived from the Arabic verb laffa, meaning "to wrap" or "to coil", contextually referring to intertwined trees or branches.

== History ==
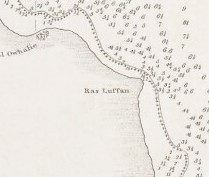
An 1824 map showing Ras Laffan

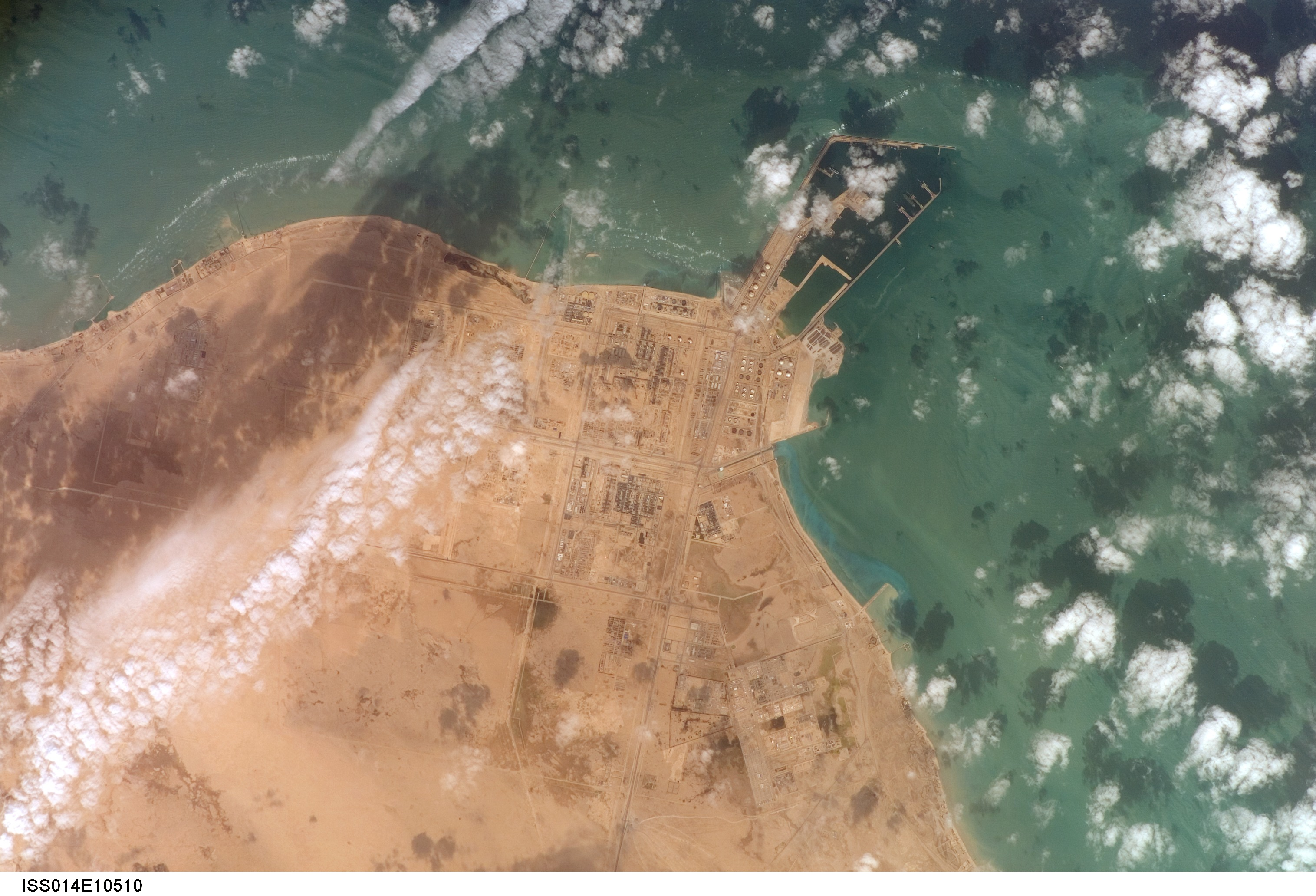
Satellite imagery of Ras Laffan in 2006

The earliest-known English text to describe Ras Laffan was in the 1890 book The Persian Gulf Pilot, published by the United Kingdom Hydrographic Office. It recounts only geographic features, implying that the area was not settled at the time. In an early 1904 transcript of the Gazetteer of the Persian Gulf, Oman and Central Arabia by J. G. Lorimer, it is mentioned that a pearling bank known as Umm Al Shebh is found off the coast of Ras Laffan, although Lorimer provides no description of Ras Laffan itself.

As an industrial city, Ras Laffan was commissioned in 1996. The purpose of its founding was to host petrochemical facilities for the natural gas obtained from the North Field. The North Field, found in 1971, is the world's biggest natural gas field, occupying an offshore area of roughly 6,000 km^{2} (2,300 sq mi). The North Field contains over 900 trillion tcsf of recoverable gas.

Ras Laffan's commissioning in 1996 marks the completion date for the city's first liquefied natural gas (LNG) plant to convert the natural gas obtained from the North Field into LNG. At first, it was estimated that only 106 km^{2} (41 sq mi) would be needed for industrial operations. However, in 2004, this figure was more than drastically increased, to 296 km^{2} (114 sq mi).

In March 2011, the city signed a memorandum of understanding with the Port of Rotterdam on the occasion of an official visit by Queen Beatrix to Qatar.

Qatargas announced in May 2019 that the company's Ras Laffan terminal received its 10,000th non-LNG related shipment.

=== 2026 Iran war ===
On 2 March 2026, the third day of the 2026 Iran war, the Qatari Ministry of Defense announced that Ras Laffan and Mesaieed Industrial City were struck by Iran, leading QatarEnergy to announce a "force majeure" and a halt to all liquefied natural gas production in the country, which in turn led to soaring gas prices. On March 6, it was reported that according to satellite imagery analysis by both Bloomberg and the Energy Economics and Society Research Institute in Tokyo, Ras Laffan, the main gas facility in Qatar, appears to have not been damaged before the "unprecedented shutdown" which sent fuel prices higher.

Iran launched an attack targeting Ras Laffan on 18 March, reportedly in retaliation for an Israeli attack on Iran's natural gas facilities. According to Qatari authorities, four of the five ballistic missiles fired toward the site were intercepted, while one struck the facility, causing fires and what QatarEnergy described as “extensive damage”. Two of the facility's 14 production units were damaged, which reduced LNG production capacity by 17%. Qatari officials reported that it could take three to five years to repair them, while QatarEnergy expects to lose revenues worth about $20 billion per year.

The attack raised further concerns over disruptions to global energy markets, particularly given Qatar’s role as one of the world’s largest LNG exporters.

=== 2026 Barzan gas plant explosion ===
On 21 June, an explosion occurred as workers were restarting operations that had been previously halted in March at the Barzan local gas supply facility in Ras Laffan Industrial City. The explosion killed at least 13 people and injured 66 others. Qatar's Interior Ministry described the incident as a "technical accident," while Energy Minister Saad Sherida al-Kaabi said there was no indication of sabotage and that exports would not be affected. An investigation was launched, with authorities confirming the deceased were foreign workers from India and Pakistan.

== Geography ==
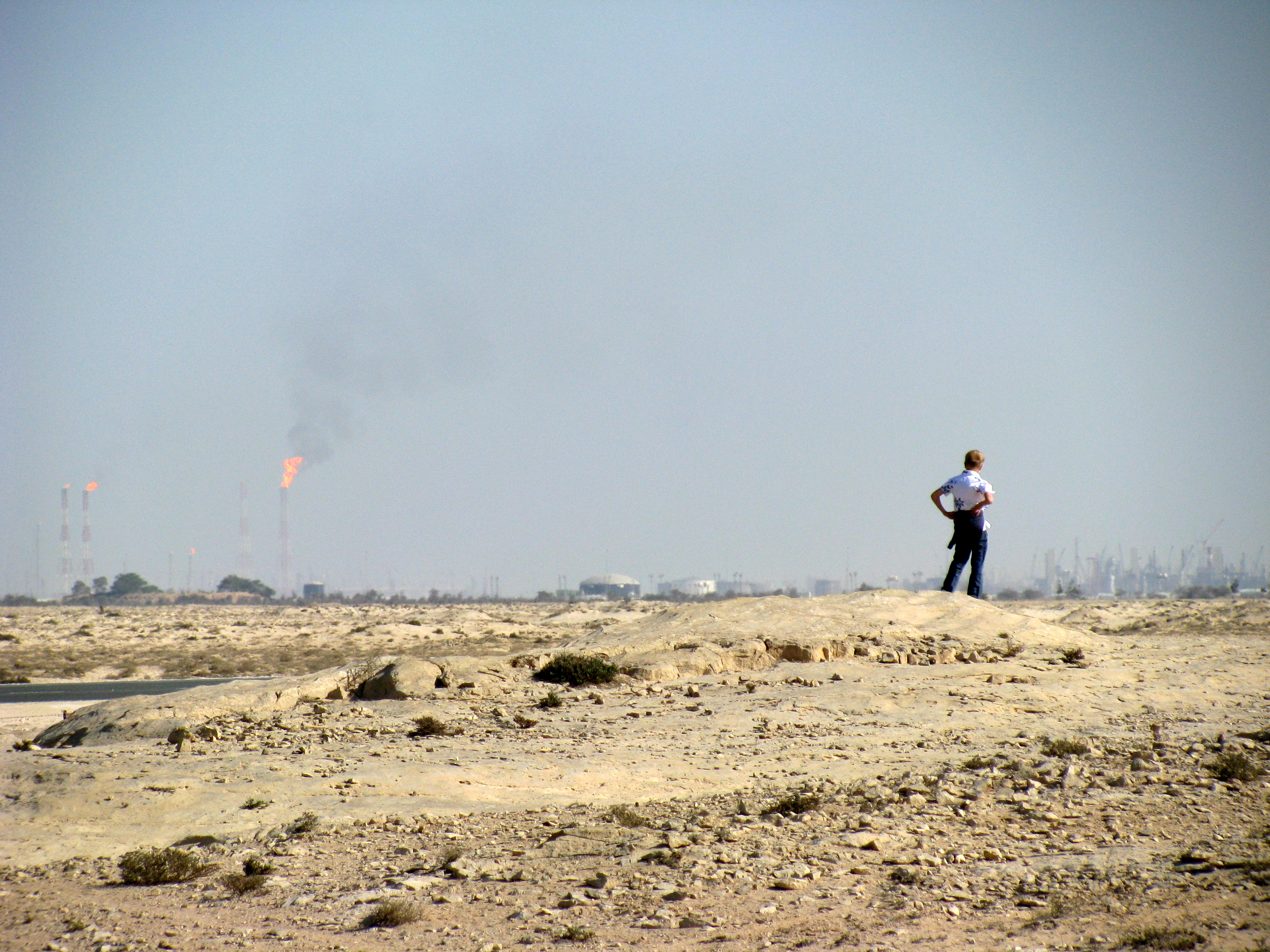
Far view of LNG production in Ras Laffan from the ridges of Jebel Jassassiyeh

Ras Laffan is located at a very low elevation and has sandy soils. It is 50 miles (80 km) north of the capital Doha and 23 miles (37 km) southeast of Ras Rakan. There is a reef off the coast.

=== Wildlife ===
Together with Fuwayrit, Ras Laffan accommodates approximately 30% of all sea turtle nests in Qatar. The area has been noted for the presence of the rough-tailed gecko as well as communal nesting sites.

Common vegetation found in Ras Laffan includes arfaj (Rhanterium epapposum), rak (Salvadora persica), desert thumbs (Cynomorium coccineum), ndeewa (Cressa cretica), rukbah (Cyperus jeminicus) near the coast, incense grass (Cymbopogon commutatus) in sandy depressions, kebaisha (Erodium glaucophyllum), reeds (Phragmites australis) in wet areas, ja'ad (Teucrium polium), nafayj (Pulicaria gnaphalodes), and stoneseed (Echiochilon jugatum).

Other common vegetation found in Ras Laffan include mature shrubs of the Taverniera genus including aelijaan (Taverniera spartea) and dahseer (Taverniera aegyptiaca). Roughly 17 hectares of mangroves are found off the coast of Ras Laffan.

In a 2010 survey of Ras Laffan's coastal waters conducted by the Qatar Statistics Authority, it was found that its maximum depth was 12.5 meters (41 ft) and minimum depth was 5 meters (16 ft). The waters had an average pH of 8.05, a salinity of 46.94 psu, an average temperature of 24.6 °C (76.3 °F) and 6.86 mg/L of dissolved oxygen.

Laffan Environmental Society is an environmental NGO formed as a joint partnership between QatarEnergy Industrial Cities and several other large companies operating in Ras Laffan. It was established as a response to calls for improved environmental management in the area surrounding the city resulting from petrochemical processing.

== Industry ==
=== Companies and facilities ===
The following companies have an industrial presence in Ras Laffan:

- Al Karanaa Petrochemical
- Al Khaleej Gas
- Al Sajeel Petrochemical
- Barzan Gas Company
- Dolphin Energy
- Laffan Refinery
- Oryx GTL
- Pearl GTL
- QatarEnergy LNG
- QPower
- Ras Girtas Power Company
- Ras Laffan Olefins Company
- Ras Laffan Power Company

=== Power generation and desalination ===
Currently, Ras Laffan accommodates three power generation and water desalination plants, abbreviated as Ras Laffan A, B, and C (also known as Ras Qartas Energy Plant). In 2014, Kahramaa announced a planned project which would see the desalination capacity of the plants increase from 35 million gallons of water per day to 65 million gallons per day. The project began in 2017.

In 1999, QatarEnergy proposed to construct a facility which would meet the water cooling requirements of Ras Laffan's petrochemical industries. This project came to fruition with the launch of the facility's inaugural phase in 2003 with an hourly production capacity of 308,000 cubic meters of seawater. By 2010, the two remaining phases were completed, increasing the hourly production capacity to 937,000 cubic meters of seawater.

=== Natural gas ===
In 2017, Qatargas and ExxonMobil launched the $10.4 billion Barzan Gas Project as a joint venture.

=== Ras Laffan Support Services Area ===
Companies providing support services to the petrochemicals in Ras Laffan have been based in the specially designated Ras Laffan Support Services Area since its inauguration in March 2013. The area's facilities consist of three large-scale workshops, a yard, and an administration building occupying an area of 46,600 square meters. Mainly, companies based in this area provide replacement and repair of damaged electrical and petrochemical-related equipment.

=== Port of Ras Laffan ===
The Port of Ras Laffan is the world's biggest petrochemicals export port, taking up a grand total of 56 square km. The first time an LNG carrier docked in the port was in 1996. In 2015, the port had the capacity to dock 200 tankers annually.

=== Erhama bin Jaber Al Jalahma Shipyard ===
Named after the legendary Arab pirate Rahmah ibn Jabir al-Jalahimah, the Erhama bin Jaber Al Jalahma Shipyard occupies 110 hectares and is used by Nakilat Damen Shipyards Qatar.

== Healthcare ==
The city is served by Ras Laffan Hospital, which is spread over 200,000 square meters and features four levels, including an underground level. The bed capacity is 118, with future plans to expand this with the addition of 100 beds. A mosque with a 400-worshiper capacity is also in the works. It has a 30-bed emergency building distributed over 6,000 square meters of the hospital. Hamad Medical Corporation (HMC) is responsible for overseeing the hospital's financing.

One health clinic is in the city, and like the hospital, it too is financed by HMC.

=== Education and safety ===
Ras Laffan Emergency & Safety College is a training center for emergency professionals created to address the safety needs of the city's industrial companies.

== Transport ==
Ras Laffan is connected with Al Khor City through Al Huwailah Link Road. In November 2014, the 16-km road was improved by increasing it from one lane to four lanes.

== See also ==
- List of LNG terminals
