= Saad Sherida al-Kaabi =

Minister of Energy in Qatar

His Excellency Saad Sherida al-Kaabi
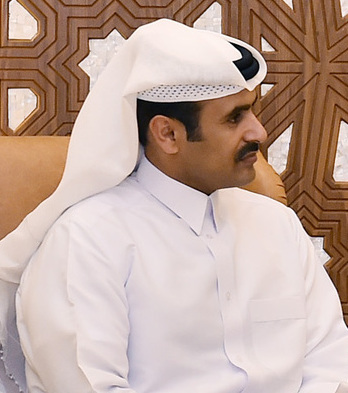
- Saad Sherida al-Kaabi, 2017

Minister of State for Energy
- Incumbent
- Assumed office 2018
- Monarch: Tamim bin Hamad Al Thani
- Prime Minister: Abdullah bin Nasser bin Khalifa Al Thani; Khalid bin Khalifa bin Abdul Aziz Al Thani; Mohammed bin Abdulrahman bin Jassim Al Thani
- Preceded by: Mohammed Saleh Al Sada

Personal details
- Education: B Sc in Petroleum and Natural Gas Engineering from Pennsylvania State University (1991)
- Alma mater: Pennsylvania State University

Saad Sherida al-Kaabi (Arabic: سعد شريدة الكعبي) is the current Minister of Energy in Qatar, and the President and CEO of QatarEnergy, the state owned corporation which operates all oil and gas activities in the State of Qatar.

== Education ==
Al-Kaabi attended Pennsylvania State University in 1986 where he studied petroleum and natural gas engineering. He graduated in 1991 with a Bachelor of Science degree in petroleum and natural gas engineering.

== Career ==
Al-Kaabi joined QatarEnergy in 1986 during his studies at Pennsylvania State University.

After graduation, al-Kaabi joined QatarEnergy's Reservoir & Field Development Department. In the following years, he held various positions in petroleum engineering as well as technical, commercial and supervisory positions. Eventually he became Manager of Gas Development, with responsibility for the management of the North Field. He and his team are credited with launching and implementing different gas projects in short time periods and thus contributing to Qatar's rise in LNG and GTL.

In 2006, al-Kaabi became the Director of QatarEnergy’s Oil & Gas Ventures Directorate, which is now responsible for all of Qatar's oil and gas fields and all exploration activities. In September 2014, al-Kaabi was appointed as QatarEnergy's Managing Director. He later became President and Chief Executive Officer (November 2014) as part of a major re-organization of QatarEnergy.

Al-Kaabi is the chairman of Industries Qatar, a large cooperation overseeing several of the emirate's industrial efforts and dealing primarily in petrochemicals, steel and fertilizers.

In 2018, al-Kaabi was appointed to be Qatar's Minister of State for Energy Affairs.

In April 2021, the first Net-Zero Producers Forum (NPF) was held by representatives of 40% of the worlds gas and oil production. At the NPF in Houston, Texas in March 2022, al-Kaabi signed the Terms of Reference (ToR) along with Secretary of Energy of the United States Jennifer Granholm, Minister of Energy of Saudi Arabia Prince Abdulaziz bin Salman, Minister of Natural Resources of Canada Jonathan Wilkinson and the Deputy Minister of Petroleum Resources of Norway Amund Vik.

In February 2022, he chaired the Gas Exporting Countries Forum (GECF) in Doha, in which he pointed out the importance of pushing natural gas and promoting growth that is sustainable in the gas industry.

== Energy crisis ==
Due to the situation with Russian gas distributions, al-Kaabi met with Germany's Vice Chancellor and Minister for Economic Affairs and Climate Action, Robert Habeck in March 2022. They spoke of the possible LNG terminals that were to be built in Germany and also to discuss long-term LNG supplies to be delivered to Germany from Qatar.

In February 2022, al-Kaabi met with European Union's Commissioner for Energy Kadri Simson to discuss the assistance that Qatar could provide Europe. During the virtual meeting possible supply options were explored in the event that Russia cuts the gas off to European regions. He stated that the possibility of Qatar assisting would be there but to cover the full needs of the EU with their supplies was not foreseeable. With the diversion of supplies, 15 percent of Qatars LNG which is not in long-term contracts already could be used to assist the EU and slowly remove them from the Russian supply demands. As the crisis continued, and further issues from Russia occurred, al-Kaabi stated in March 2022 that the supplies going to the EU will not be disrupted or diverted.

In May 2022, Germany and Qatar signed an agreement to a long-term plan and focuses on their energy partnership.
