= Mesaieed Industrial Area =

Mesaieed Industrial Area منطقة مسيعيد الصناعية
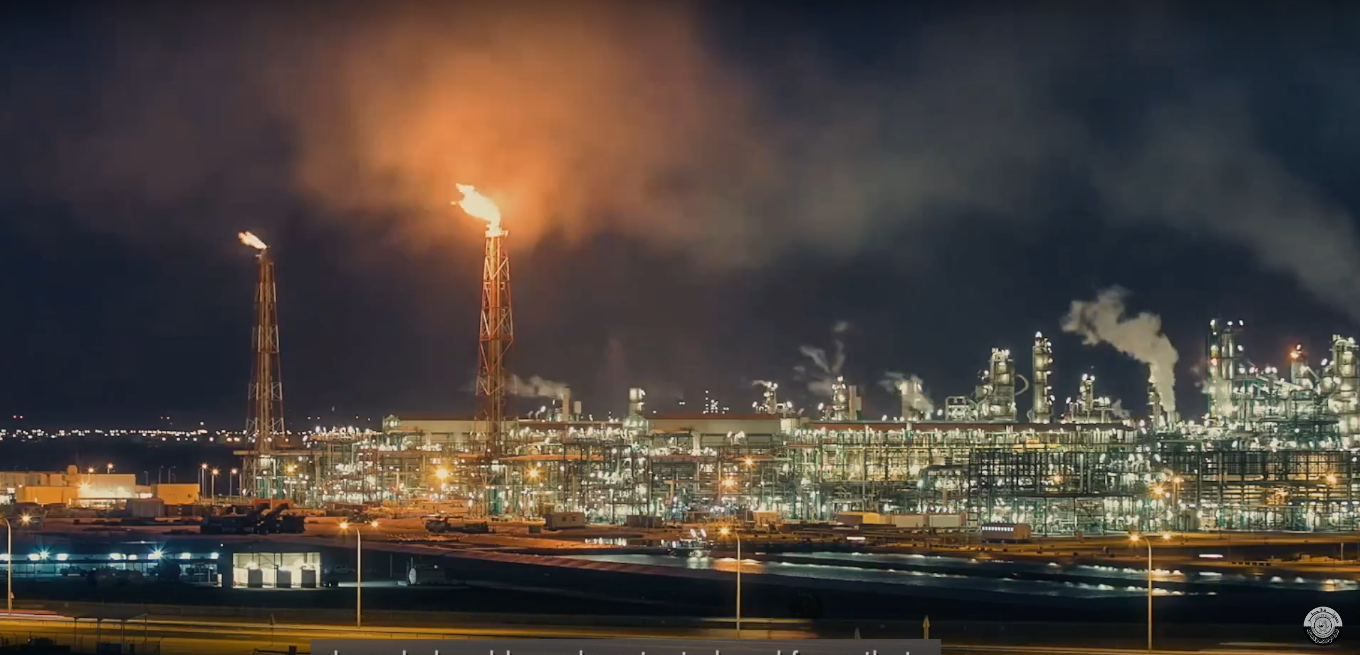
- Panoramic view of the Mesaieed Industrial Area at night.

- Location within Qatar
- Coordinates: 24°59′21″N 51°34′48″E
- Country: Qatar
- Municipality: Al Wakrah Municipality
- Zone: Zone 93
- Established: 1949

Area
  - Total: 60.7 km^{2} (23.4 sq mi)

Population (2015)
  - Total: 106
  - Density: 1.75/km^{2} (4.52/sq mi)

Mesaieed Industrial Area (Arabic: منطقة مسيعيد الصناعية, romanized: Minṭaqat Musaī'īd aṣ-Ṣinā'iyah; also known as Umm Sa'id Industrial Area or Mesaieed Heavy Industries) is an industrial area in Al Wakrah Municipality in Qatar approximately 40 kilometres (25 mi) south of Doha. It is a locality of the city of Mesaieed and was previously a designated district of Mesaieed Municipality before the municipality was merged with Al Wakrah Municipality.

Both Mesaieed and its industrial area are administered by a subdivision of QatarEnergy called "Mesaieed Industry City Management", which was established in 1996.

== History ==
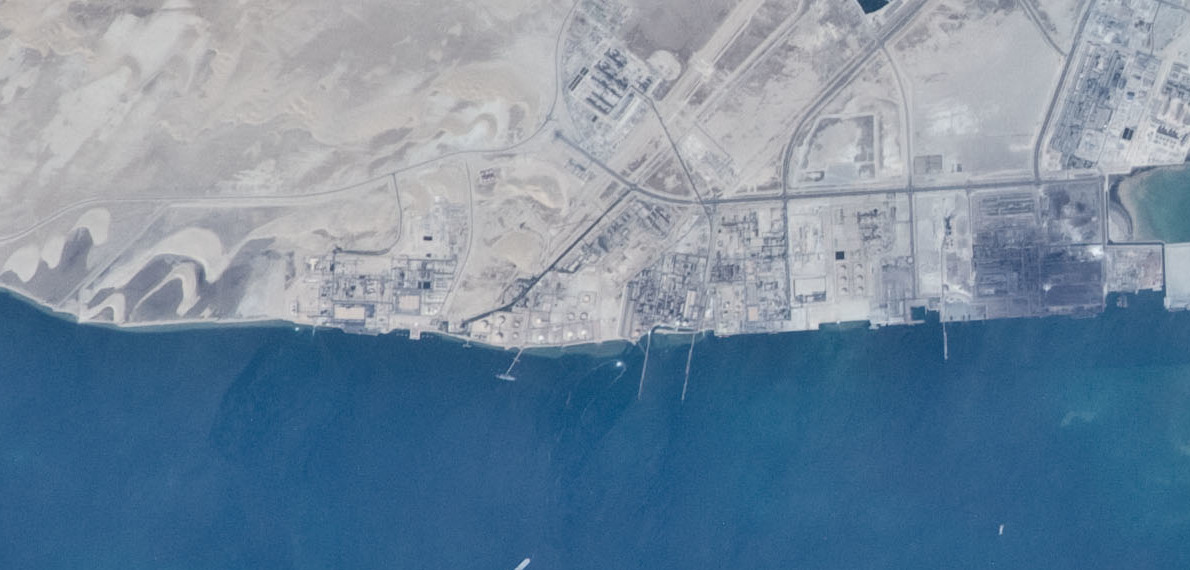
Satellite imagery of Mesaieed Industrial Area off the Persian Gulf in 2010

Mesaieed was established in 1949 as a tanker terminal by QatarEnergy on a previously uninhabited site along the coast. It was chosen by the company because of its proximity to the working population in Doha and Al Wakrah and because of the depth of its waters. It was the only deepwater port in Qatar for more than 20 years. The first industrial facilities prepared on site were oil pumps and oil storage tanks.

A new site for an NGL plant was prepared by QatarEnergy in 1974. Three years later, the site caught fire and was disbanded. Further development by the government was undertaken on Mesaieed from 1975 to 1978. They installed industrial facilities, mechanical equipment and developed the road system at an estimated cost of $200 million.

A firefighting unit for the industrial area was established in July 1985.

In early March 2026, during the Iran war, Mesaieed and Ras Laffan Industrial City, also in Qatar, were struck by Iran, leading QatarEnergy to announce a halt to liquefied natural gas production, which in turn led to soaring gas prices.

== Administration ==
It was administered wholly by QatarEnergy at the time of its inception. The government had agreed to the company's request to allow it full jurisdiction over the area and, until the 1960s, the government had prioritized the development of Doha rather than its natural gas industry. The rapid growth of oil revenue in the 1960s and the accession of Khalifa bin Hamad Al Thani in 1972 resulted in the government assuming a portion of control over the area. In 1970, the first government-prepared industrial site in Mesaieed was created for QAFCO.

In June 2016, it was announced that QatarEnergy would transfer portions of Mesaieed Industrial Area to the Economic Zones Company Qatar (Manateq), effective January 2017. Among the portions ceded to Manateq were the cement area, the light industries area and the medium industries area.

== Industry ==
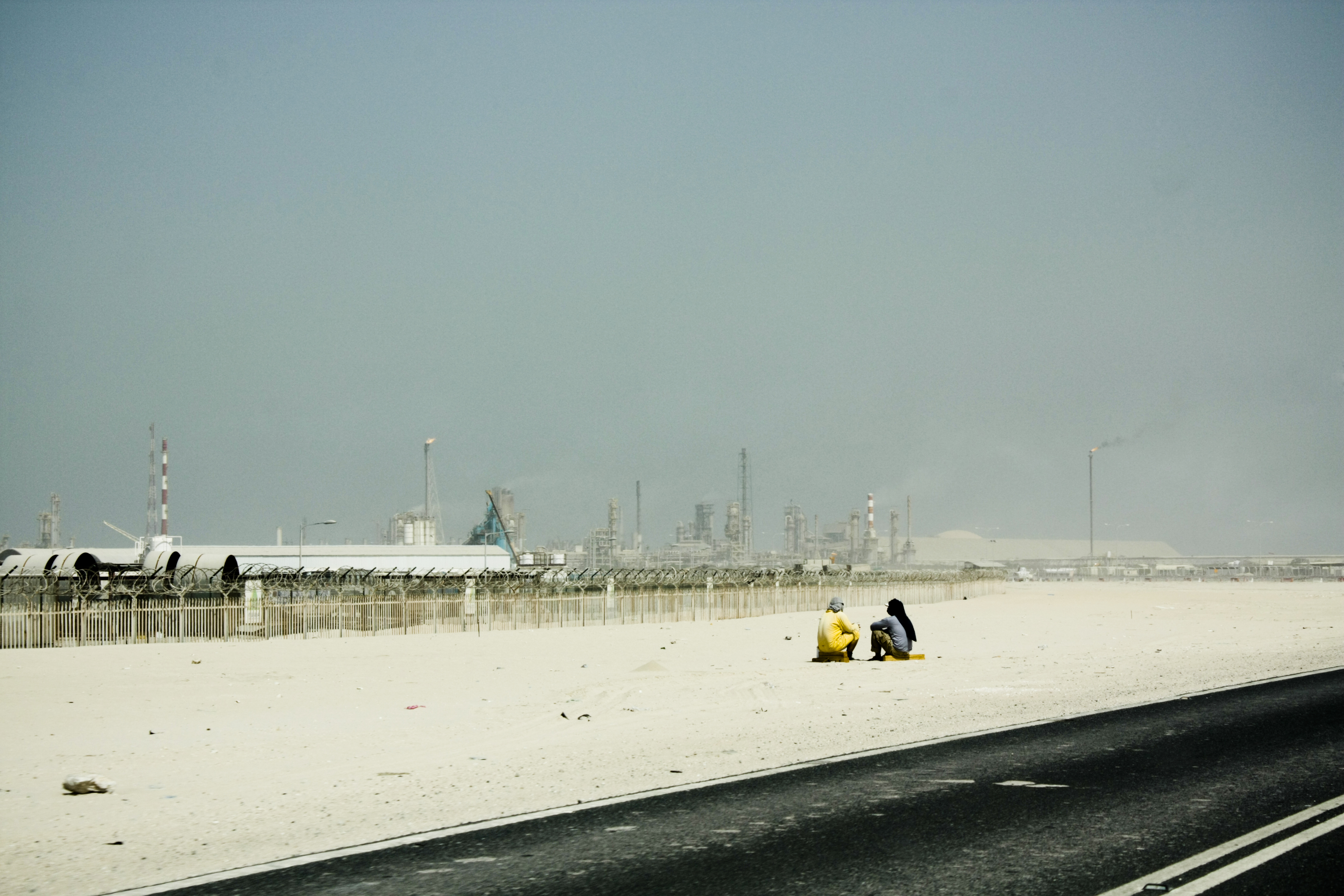
Natural gas production in the industrial area

The area is sometimes called "the core of Qatar's industry", and accommodates the main plants of the following companies:

- QatarEnergy
- QP Refinery
- Qatar Lubricants Co.
- Qatar Fertiliser Co. (QAFCO)
- Qatar Fuel Additives Co. (QAFAC)
- Qatar Petrochemical Co. (QAPCO)
- Qatar Steel Co. (Qatar Steel)
- Qatar Vinyl Co. (QVC)
- Qatar Chemicals Co. (Q-Chem)
- Qatar Aluminium (Qatalum)
- Mesaieed port authority
- Container terminal CT7

=== Flour mill ===
In 1969, a decision was reached to construct Qatar's first flour mill in Mesaieed. In 1972, the facilities became operational with a capacity of 50 tonnes per day.

=== Aluminum production ===
Qatalum, an aluminium smelter plant, was launched in April 2010 in Mesaieed. It is a joint venture between QatarEnergy and Norsk Hydro. Its annual capacity in September 2011 was 585,000 metric tons of primary aluminium. A 1350 MW natural gas power plant has also been built to ensure a stable supply of electricity.

=== Natural gas to liquids ===
NGL operations began on site in the 1970s.

=== Oil refineries ===
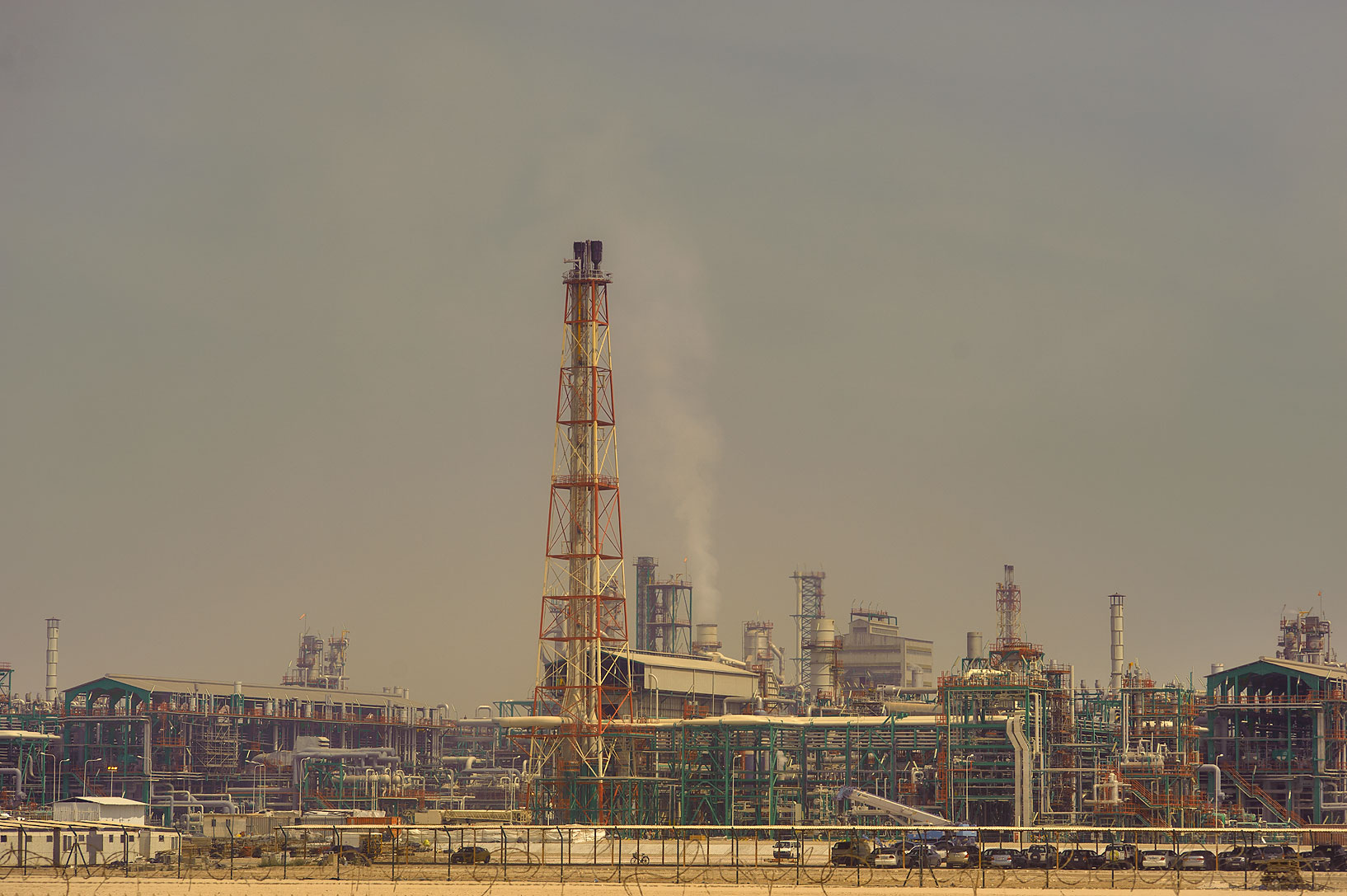
Oil factories in Mesaieed Industrial Area

The oil refineries in the industrial area have a combined capacity of 137,000 barrels per day.

=== Nitrogen fertilizers ===
Urea and ammonia production is regulated by Qatar Fertiliser Company, the only fertilizer producer in the country. The company was established in 1969 by emiri decree. The construction of its processing facilities was completed by 1973. It had a daily production capacity of 900 tonnes of ammonia, with two-thirds of this being used in the manufacture of 1,000 tonnes of urea. It was staffed mainly by employees of Norsk Hydro in its initial years, with whom it had signed a long-term cooperation agreement.

== Transport ==
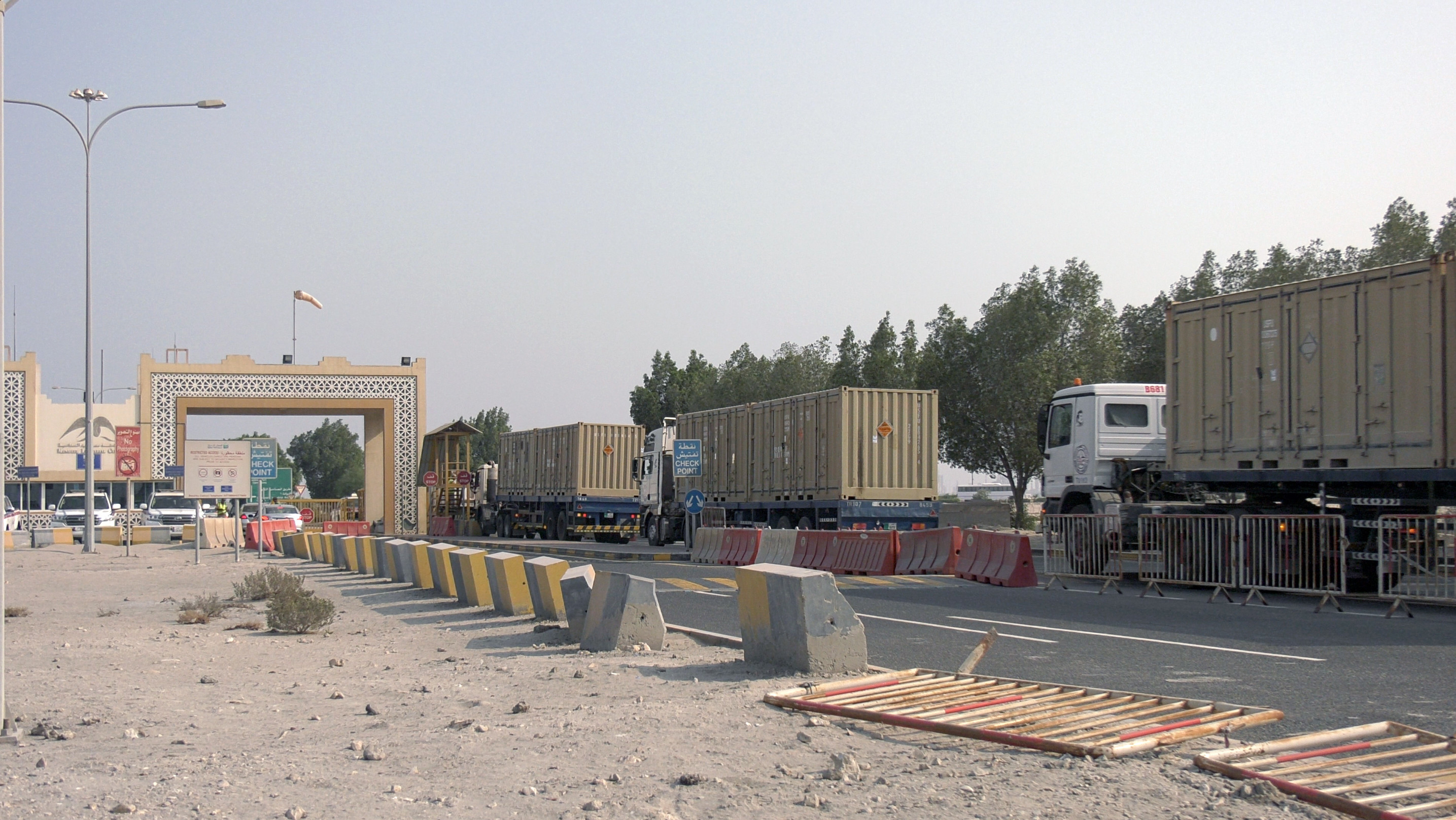
Convoy of vehicles at Mesaieed Port

An airstrip was constructed in the 1950s, but it went out of commission during the 1960s.

=== Mesaieed Port ===
Mesaieed Port, situated in a natural bay, serves as Qatar's principal port for petrochemical, metallurgical, and construction-related industries. In its initial years, the Mesaieed industrial area had imported its machinery and construction materials through the port of Zekreet. To circumvent this, Mesaieed Port was developed during the 1950s and 1960s. It was Qatar's first deepwater port.

The port has 29 active berths and operates year-round on a 24-hour basis. Facilities include pilotage, tug and mooring services, and berths equipped for a variety of cargo types.

== Demographics ==
As of the 2010 census, the settlement comprised 40 housing units and 57 establishments. There were 123 people living in the settlement all of which were male. Out of the 123 inhabitants, 99% were 20 years of age or older and 1% was under the age of 20. The literacy rate stood at 89.4%.

Employed persons made up 100% of the total population.

| Year | Population |
|---|---|
| 2004 | 9 |
| 2010 | 123 |
| 2015 | 106 |
