= Gas to liquids =

Conversion of natural gas to liquid petroleum products

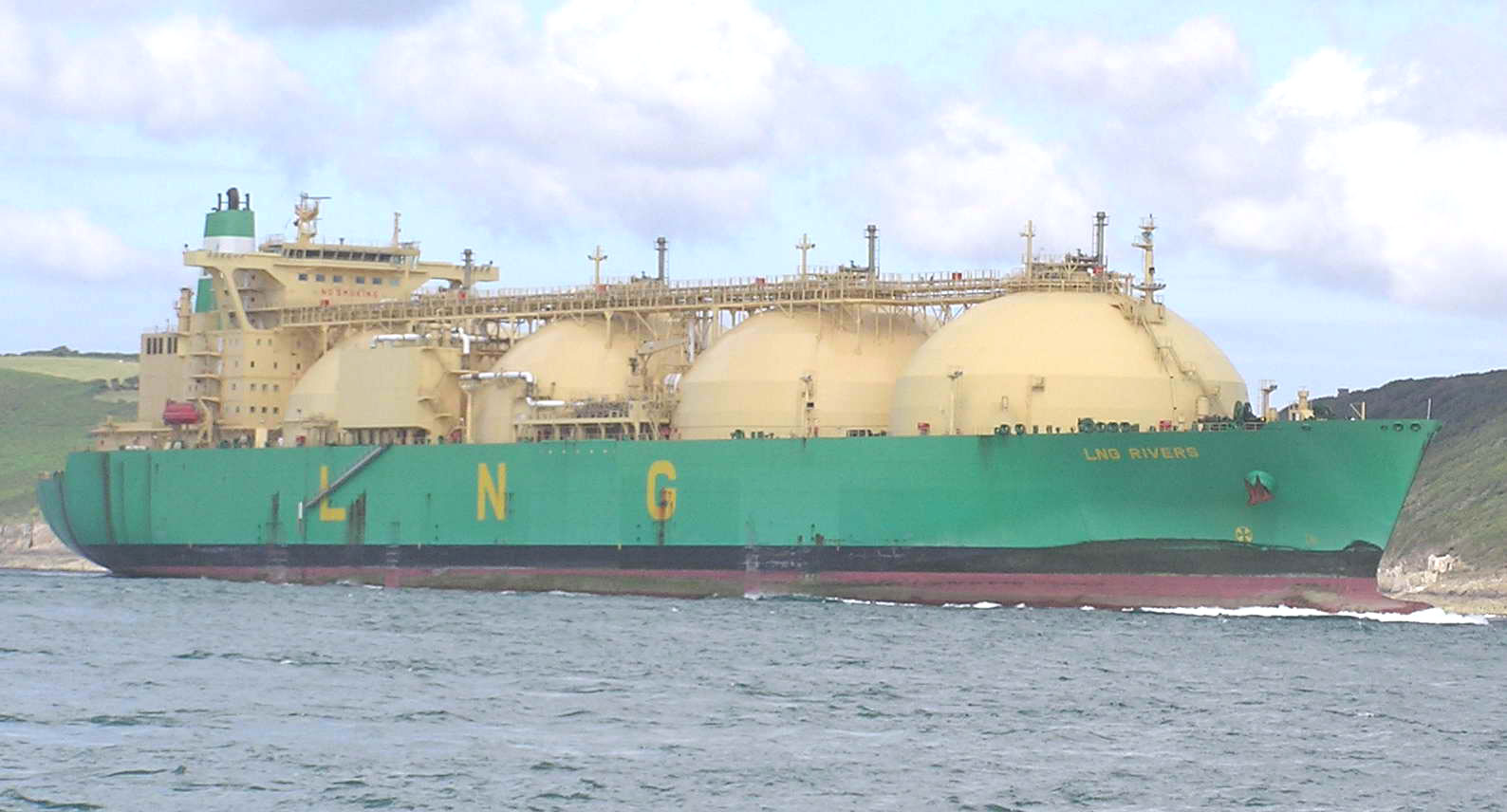
LNG tankers are used to transport methane.

Gas to liquids (GTL) is a refinery process to convert natural gas or other gaseous hydrocarbons into longer-chain hydrocarbons, such as gasoline or diesel fuel. Methane-rich gases are converted into liquid synthetic fuels. Two general strategies exist:

- (i) direct partial oxidation of methane to methanol, which is not commercially significant.
- (ii) Fischer–Tropsch-like processes that convert syngas (mixture of carbon monoxide and hydrogen) into hydrocarbons. Alternatively the syngas can be converted to methanol, which is then converted to hydrocarbons (see MTG). Strategy ii can start from natural gas (steam reforming) or from coal.

The goal for GTL is to produce liquid fuels, which are both more valuable and more readily transported than methane. Methane must be cooled below its critical temperature of −82.3 °C in order to be liquified under pressure. Because of the associated cryogenic apparatus, LNG tankers are used for transport. Methanol is a conveniently handled combustible liquid, but its energy density is half of that of gasoline.

== Fischer–Tropsch process ==
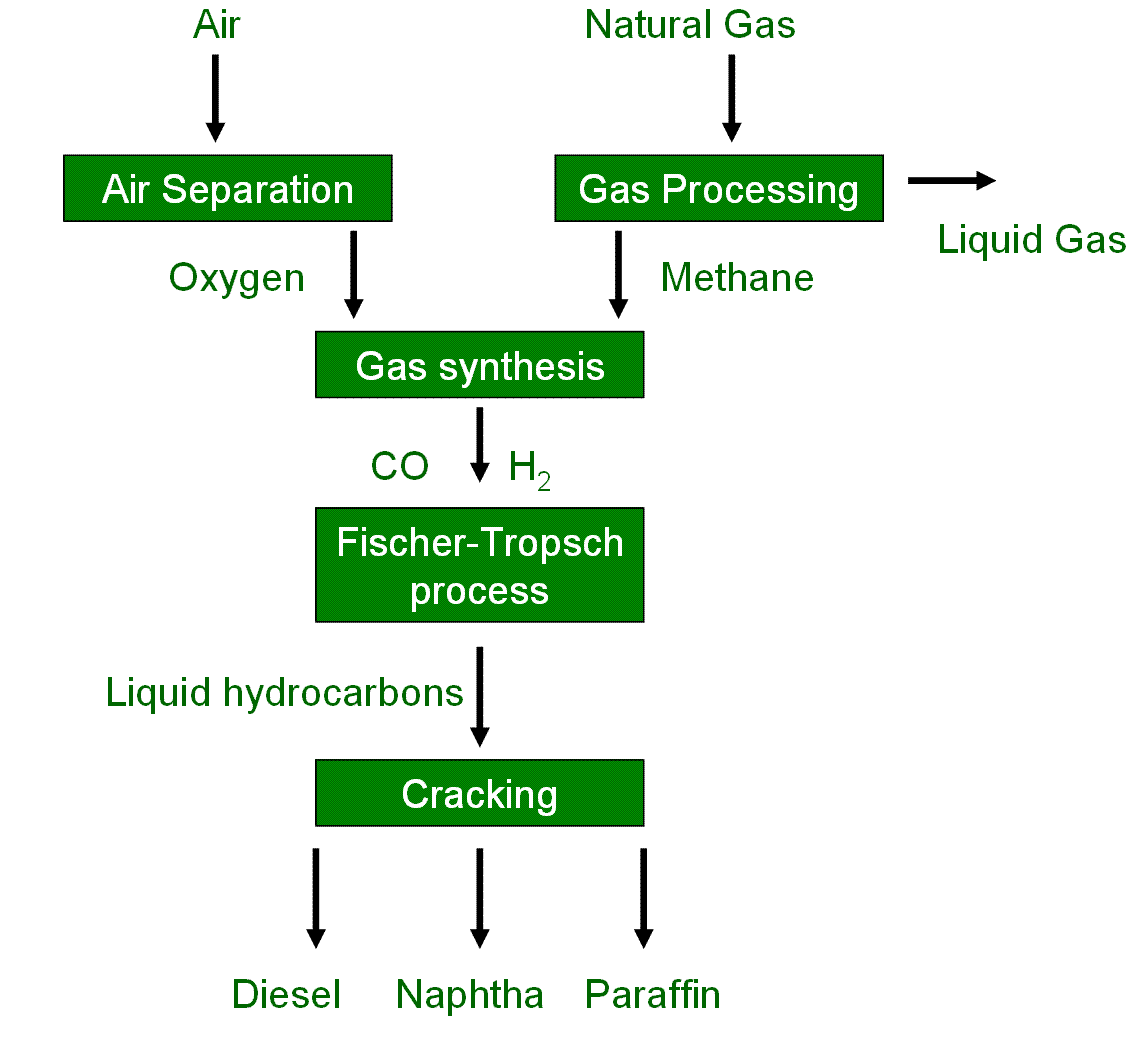
GTL process using the Fischer Tropsch method

A GtL process may be established via the Fischer–Tropsch process which comprises several chemical reactions that convert a mixture of carbon monoxide (CO) and hydrogen (H_{2}) into long-chained hydrocarbons. These hydrocarbons are typically liquid or semi-liquid and ideally have the formula (C_{n}H_{2n+2}).

In order to obtain the mixture of CO and H_{2} required for the Fischer–Tropsch process, methane (main component of natural gas) may be subjected to partial oxidation which yields a raw synthesis gas mixture of mostly carbon dioxide, carbon monoxide, hydrogen gas (and sometimes water and nitrogen). The ratio of carbon monoxide to hydrogen in the raw synthesis gas mixture can be adjusted e.g. using the water gas shift reaction. Removing impurities, particularly nitrogen, carbon dioxide and water, from the raw synthesis gas mixture yields pure synthesis gas (syngas).

The pure syngas is routed into the Fischer–Tropsch process, where the syngas reacts over an iron or cobalt catalyst to produce synthetic hydrocarbons, including alcohols.

== Mobil process ==
Methanol is made from methane (natural gas) in a series of three reactions:

- Steam reforming

CH_{4} + H_{2}O → CO + 3 H_{2} Δ_{r}H = +206 kJ mol^{−1}

- Water shift reaction

CO + H_{2}O → CO_{2} + H_{2} Δ_{r}H = −41 kJ mol^{−1}

- Synthesis

2 H_{2} + CO → CH_{3}OH Δ_{r}H = −92 kJ mol^{−1}

The methanol thus formed may be converted to gasoline by the Mobil process and methanol-to-olefins.

=== Methanol to gasoline (MTG) ===
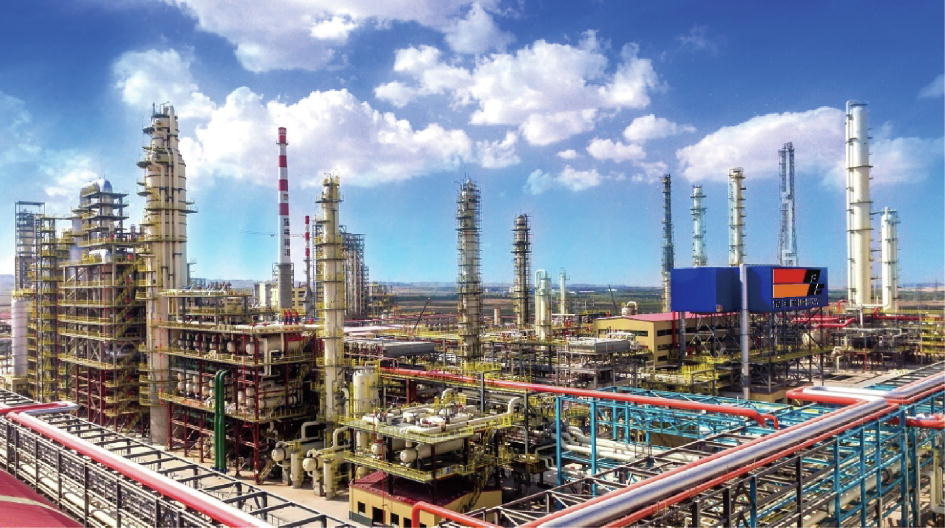
Baofeng Ningxia Methanol-to-Olefins plant

In the early 1970s, Mobil developed an alternative procedure in which natural gas is converted to syngas, which is converted to methanol. The methanol reacts in the presence of a zeolite catalyst to form various compounds. In the first step methanol is partially dehydrated to give dimethyl ether:

2 CH_{3}OH → CH_{3}OCH_{3} + H_{2}O

The mixture of dimethyl ether and methanol is then further dehydrated over a zeolite catalyst such as ZSM-5, and in practice is polymerized and to give a gasoline. In China, JAMG operates the Mobil MTG process on coal-derived methanol. Also relevant is the Topsøe improved gasoline synthesis (TiGAS).

=== Methanol to olefins ===
Methanol can be converted to olefins using zeolite and SAPO-based heterogeneous catalysts. Depending on the catalyst pore size, this process can afford either C2 or C3 products, which are important monomers.

Coal-derived methanol is heavily used in China to produce olefins (ethylene and propylene). These monomers are precursors to many commercial polymers.

=== Syngas to gasoline plus process (STG+) ===
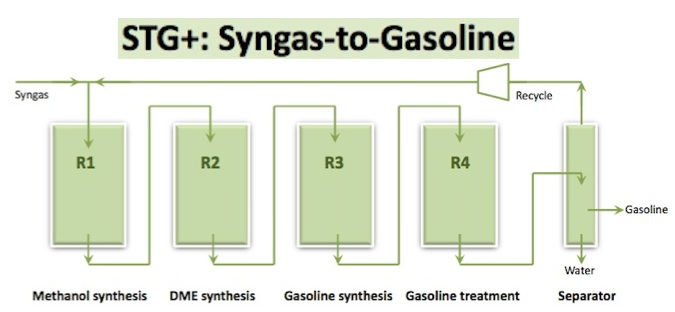
The STG+ Process

A third gas-to-liquids process builds on the MTG technology by converting natural gas-derived syngas into drop-in gasoline and jet fuel via a thermochemical single-loop process.

The STG+ process follows four principal steps in one continuous process loop. This process consists of four fixed bed reactors in series in which a syngas is converted to synthetic fuels. The steps for producing high-octane synthetic gasoline are as follows:

1. Methanol Synthesis: Syngas is fed to Reactor 1, the first of four reactors, which converts most of the syngas (CO and H_{2}) to methanol (CH_{3}OH) when passing through the catalyst bed.
2. Dimethyl Ether (DME) Synthesis: The methanol-rich gas from Reactor 1 is next fed to Reactor 2, the second STG+ reactor. The methanol is exposed to a catalyst and much of it is dehydrated to DME (CH_{3}OCH_{3}).
3. Gasoline synthesis: The Reactor 2 product gas is next fed to Reactor 3, the third reactor containing the catalyst for conversion of DME to hydrocarbons including paraffins (alkanes), aromatics, naphthenes (cycloalkanes) and small amounts of olefins (alkenes), mostly from C_{6} (number of carbon atoms in the hydrocarbon molecule) to C_{10}.
4. Gasoline Treatment: The fourth reactor provides transalkylation and hydrogenation treatment to the products coming from Reactor 3. The treatment reduces durene (tetramethylbenzene)/isodurene and trimethylbenzene components that have high freezing points and must be minimized in gasoline. As a result, the synthetic gasoline product has high octane and desirable viscometric properties.
5. Separator: Finally, the mixture from Reactor 4 is condensed to obtain gasoline. The non-condensed gas and gasoline are separated in a conventional condenser/separator. Most of the non-condensed gas from the product separator becomes recycled gas and is sent back to the feed stream to Reactor 1, leaving the synthetic gasoline product composed of paraffins, aromatics and naphthenes.

== Biological gas-to-liquids (Bio-GTL) ==
With methane as the predominant target for GTL, much attention has focused on the three enzymes that process methane. These enzymes support the existence of methanotrophs, microorganisms that metabolize methane as their only source of carbon and energy. Aerobic methanotrophs harbor enzymes that oxygenate methane to methanol. The relevant enzymes are methane monooxygenases, which are found both in soluble and particulate (i.e. membrane-bound) varieties. They catalyze the oxygenation according to the following stoichiometry:

CH_{4} + O_{2} + NADPH + H^{+} → CH_{3}OH + H_{2}O + NAD^{+}

Anaerobic methanotrophs rely on the bioconversion of methane using the enzymes called methyl-coenzyme M reductases. These organisms effect reverse methanogenesis. Strenuous efforts have been made to elucidate the mechanisms of these methane-converting enzymes, which would enable their catalysis to be replicated in vitro.

Biodiesel can be made from CO_{2} using the microbes Moorella thermoacetica and Yarrowia lipolytica. This process is known as biological gas-to-liquids.

== Commercial uses ==
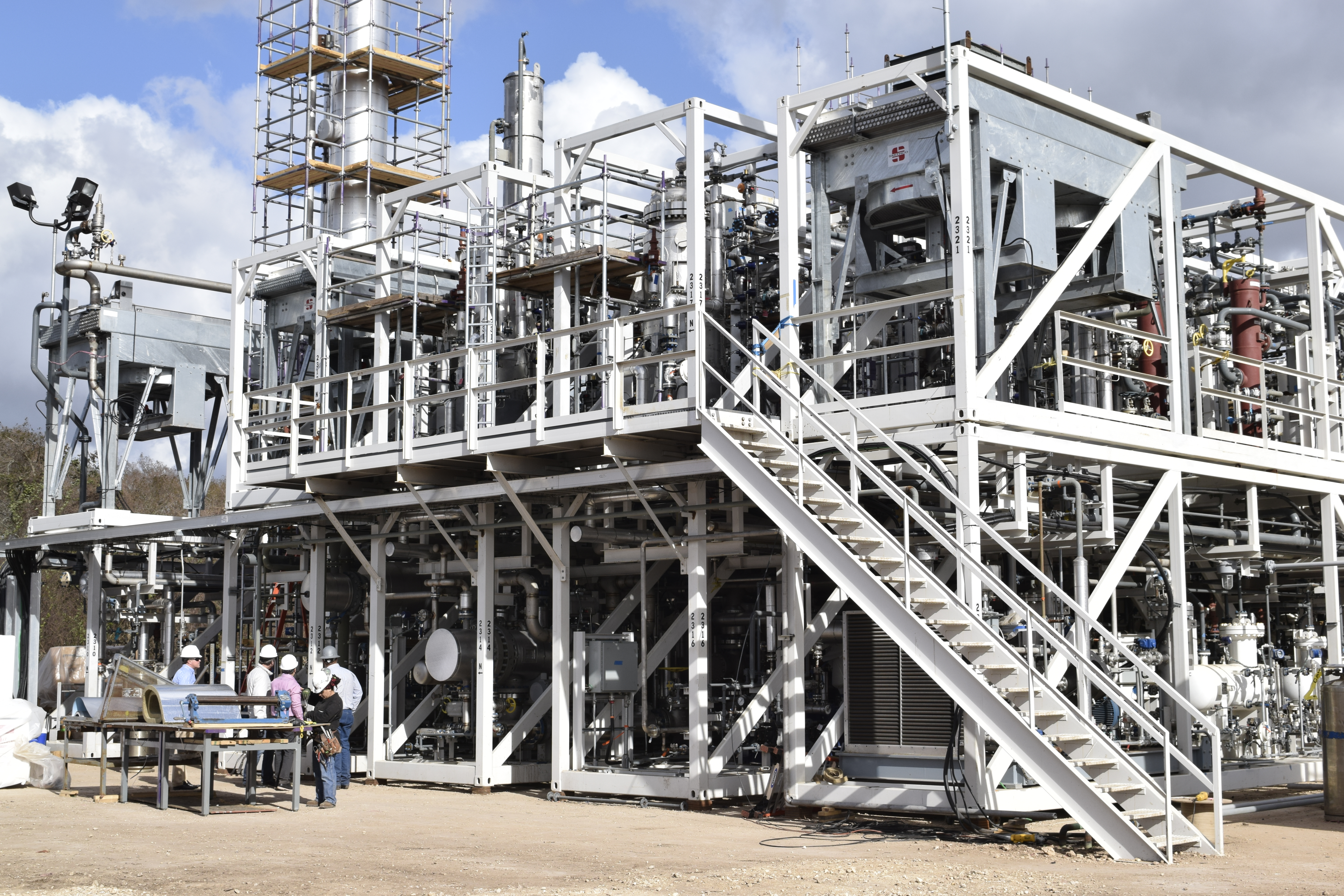
INFRA M100 GTL Plant

Using gas-to-liquids processes, refineries can convert some of their gaseous waste products (flare gas) into valuable fuel oils, which can be sold as is or blended only with diesel fuel. The World Bank estimates that over 150 billion cubic metres (5.3×10^{12} cu ft) of natural gas are flared or vented annually, an amount worth approximately $30.6 billion, equivalent to 25% of the United States' gas consumption or 30% of the European Union's annual gas consumption, a resource that could be useful using GTL. Gas-to-liquids processes may also be used for the economic extraction of gas deposits in locations where it is not economical to build a pipeline.

Royal Dutch Shell produces a diesel from natural gas in a factory in Bintulu, Malaysia. Another Shell GTL facility is the Pearl GTL plant in Qatar. Sasol built the Oryx GTL facility in Ras Laffan Industrial City, Qatar and together with Uzbekneftegaz and Petronas built the Uzbekistan GTL plant. Chevron Corporation, in a joint venture with the Nigerian National Petroleum Corporation commissioned the Escravos GTL in Nigeria, which uses Sasol technology. PetroSA, South Africa's national oil company, owns and operates a 22,000 barrels/day (capacity) GTL plant in Mossel Bay, using Sasol GTL technology.

=== Aspirational and emerging ventures ===
New generation of GTL technology is being pursued for the conversion of unconventional, remote and problem gas into valuable liquid fuels. GTL plants based on innovative Fischer–Tropsch catalysts have been built by INFRA Technology. Other mainly U.S. companies include Velocys, ENVIA Energy, Waste Management, NRG Energy, ThyssenKrupp Industrial Solutions, Liberty GTL, Petrobras, Greenway Innovative Energy, Primus Green Energy, Compact GTL, and Petronas. Several of these processes have proven themselves with demonstration flights using their jet fuels.

Another proposed solution to stranded gas involves use of novel FPSO for offshore conversion of gas to liquids such as methanol, diesel, petrol, synthetic crude, and naphtha.

== Economics of GTL ==
GTL using natural gas is more economical when there is a wide gap between the prevailing natural gas price and crude oil price on a Barrel of oil equivalent (BOE) basis. A coefficient of 0.1724 results in full oil parity. GTL is a mechanism to bring down the diesel/gasoline/crude oil international prices at par with the natural gas price in an expanding global natural gas production at cheaper than crude oil price. When natural gas is converted into GTL, the liquid products are easier to export at cheaper price rather than converting into LNG and further conversion to liquid products in an importing country.

However, GTL fuels are much more expensive to produce than conventional fuels.

== See also ==
- Biomass to liquid
- Carbon-neutral fuel
- Coal to liquid

== Bibliography ==
- Boogaard, P. J., Carrillo, J. C., Roberts, L. G., & Whale, G. F. (2017) Toxicological and ecotoxicological properties of gas-to-liquid (GTL) products. 1. Mammalian toxicology. Critical reviews in toxicology, 47(2), 121-144.
