= Kahramaa =

Qatari power and water distribution company

Qatar General Electricity and Water Corporation Kahramaa
- Type: Public
- Industry: Energy; Water
- Predecessor: Ministry of Electricity & Water
- Founded: 2000
- Headquarters: Doha, Qatar
- Area served: State of Qatar
- Key people: Abdulla Ali Abdulla Al-Theyab (president)
- Products: Electricity; Water
- Services: Utility provider
- Website: www.km.qa

Kahramaa (Qatar General Electricity and Water Corporation), was established in July 2000 to regulate and maintain the supply of electricity and water for the population of Qatar. Since inception, Kahramaa has operated as an independent corporation on a commercial basis with a total capital of eight billion Qatari riyals. Kahramaa is the sole transmission and distribution system owner and operator for the electricity and water sector in Qatar.

== History ==
During Qatar's time as a British protectorate in the 20th century, water and electricity was regulated by the British under two separate entities known as the State Electricity Department and the State Water Department. In 1968 the British announced their plans to withdraw from Qatar. Following this Qatar established the Ministry of Electricity and Water to regulate its electricity and water needs. In July 2000, the Qatar General Electricity and Water Corporation (Kahramaa) was established by emiri decree in order to regulate and maintain the supply of water and electricity for the Qatari population.

== Operations ==
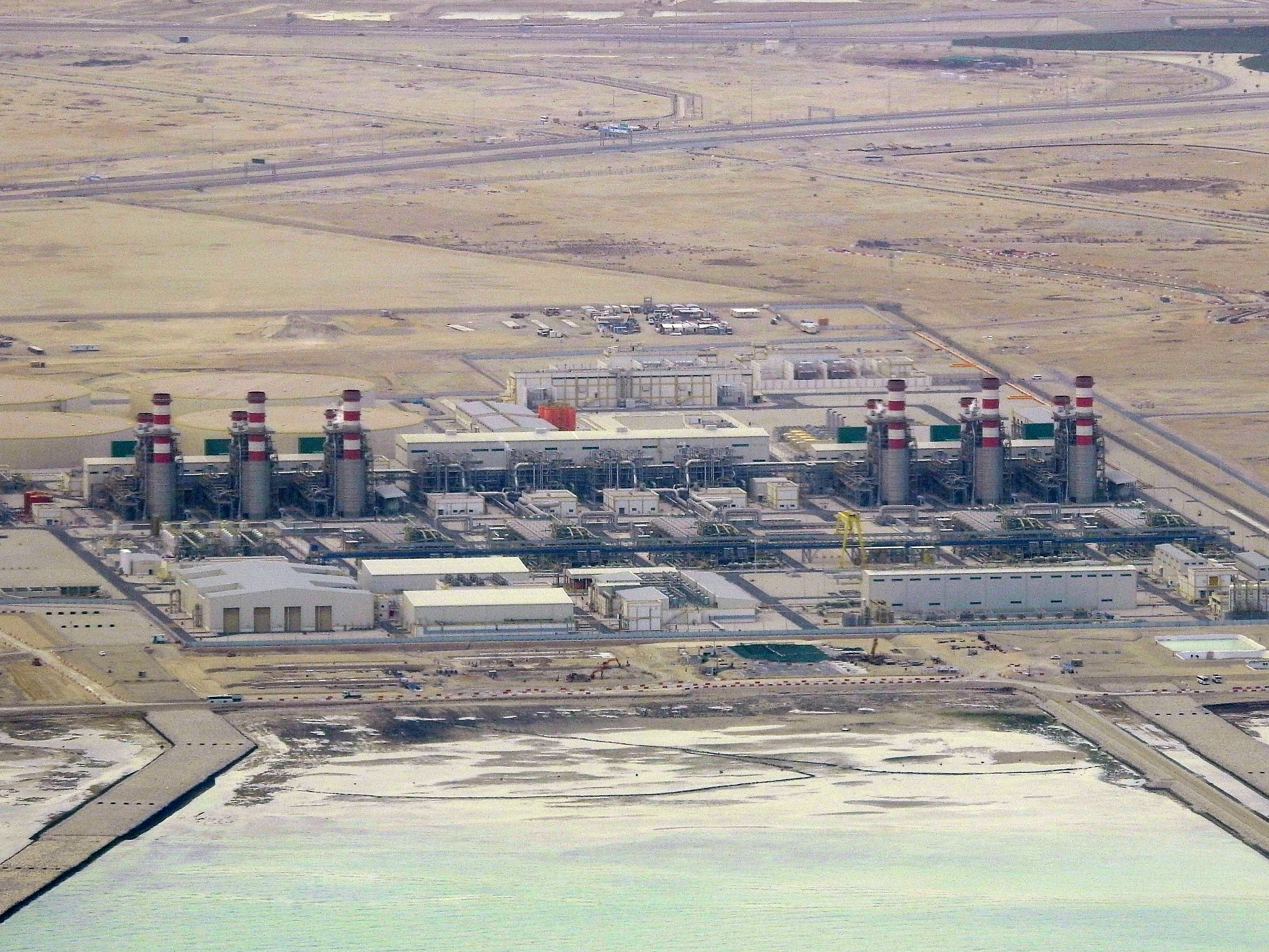
The IWPP in Umm Al Houl

In August 2015, the company announced that it would begin construction of Umm Al Houl Power, a desalination and power plant in the south of the country. The plant started its operations from July 2018. The construction was estimated to cost around $2.75 billion and will have a capacity of 2520 MW and 620,000 m^{3} (136 million imperial gallons) of potable water a day.

Qatar's first major solar power plant was announced by Kahramaa in 2014, and was slated to begin operations by 2016. Its production capacity is expected to be 15 MW. In December 2015, the company stated that it had signed an agreement with QatarEnergy for cooperation in the development of solar power plants. Kahramaa would retain 60% ownership of the plants constructed under the agreement, while QatarEnergy would retain the remaining 40%.

== Electricity sector ==
As of 2011, the electricity transmission networks consist of approximately 247 primary high voltage sub-stations. The network is coupled with 10,500 low and medium voltage sub-stations (11 kV). Its voltage sub-stations are supported by a total 4,000 km (2,500 mi) of overhead lines and 8,500 km (5,300 mi) of underground cables running across the country. The National Control Center manages all network demand and data acquisition from generation plants and primary sub-stations.

=== Electricity generation ===
Generation of electrical energy in Qatar has increased over the last millennium; the maximum load over the network during the period from 1954 to 1970 had risen from 1.9 MW to 277 MW. From 1988 to 2003, the maximum load increased from 941 MW to 2,312 MW. It reached 3,230 MW in 2006. By 2011, it had increased to 6,518 MW. The company was producing around 8,600 MW by 2014; a 2,000 MW surplus when compared to the 6,600 MW of demand. By 2020, the demand had risen to 8,600 MW.

=== Electricity generation capacity ===
Kahramaa's electricity generation capacity was 28,144 GWh in 2010. This figure increased to 30,730 GWh in 2011 and 34,788 GWh in 2012 before dropping slightly, to 34,688 GWh in 2013. Another large expansion was recorded in 2014, when the electricity production capacity was raised to 38,963 GWh. Overall, from 2010 to 2014, Kahramaa's electricity generation capacity was increased at an average annual rate of around 10%.

== Water sector ==
The water network in Qatar has been expanded extensively in recent years, the growth of urban areas; industry and agriculture has led to the increase in the length of the water network to 3,622 kilometres (2,251 mi) and expansion in the number of storage reservoirs to 23 with a total capacity of 1,180,000 m^{3} (259 million imperial gallons) of potable water a day.

=== Water capacities ===
Statistical data in the water sector shows a remarkable growth in the capacities of water storage facilities. Such an increase has amounted to 1,180,000 m^{3} (259 million imperial gallons) a year in 2006, in comparison to less than 200 million imperial gallons (910,000 m^{3}) in 1988. The annual water capacity was recorded as 3,740,000 m^{3} (822 million imperial gallons) in 2009 and by 2014 had increased to 4,950,000 m^{3} (1,088 million imperial gallons).

=== Water quality ===
To ensure safe and clean drinking water to high standards and quality, water is subject to daily random bacteriological and laboratory tests undertaken by Kahramaa. Samples are collected and tested from the storage reservoirs and networks up to the customers' storage facilities.
