= Bhimeshwar =

Bhimeshwor भिमेश्वर
- Municipality
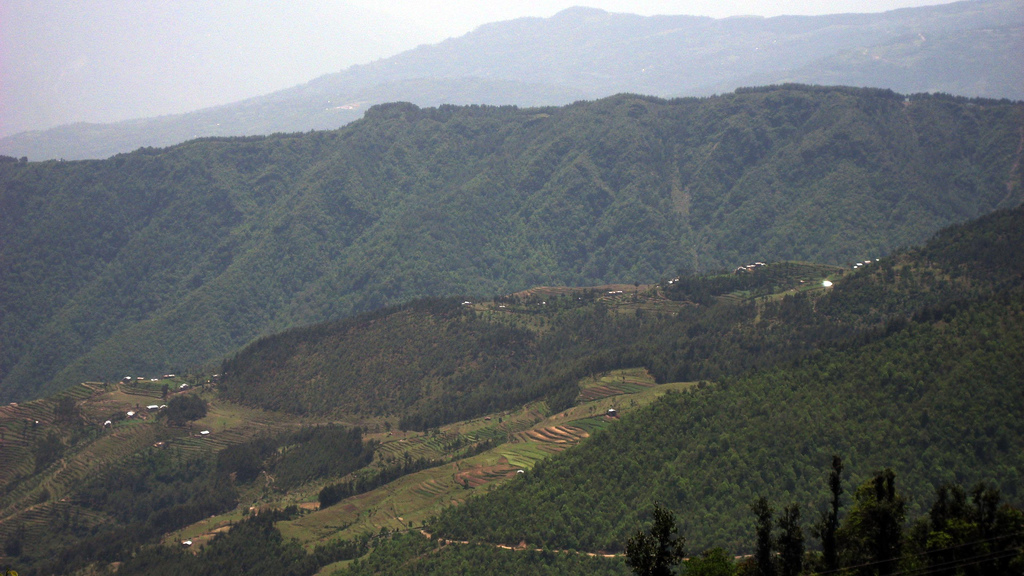
- Landscape near Charikot; from North of the town

- Location in Nepal
- Coordinates: 27°40′0″N 86°2′0″E
- Country: Nepal
- Province: Bagmati Province
- District: Dolakha District

Government
  - Type: Mayor–council government
  - Mayor: Mr. Ishwor Narayan Manandhar
  - Deputy Mayor: Kamala Basnet

Area
  - Total: 132.50 km^{2} (51.16 sq mi)

Population (2021)
  - Total: 40,000
  - Density: 300/km^{2} (780/sq mi)
- Time zone: UTC+5:45 (Nepal Time)
- Postal code: 45500
- Area code: 049
- Website: http://bhimeshwormun.gov.np/en

Bhimeshwor, (formerly Charikot), is a municipality in north-eastern Nepal and the headquarters of Dolakha District in Bagmati Province that was established in 1997 by merging the former village development committees Charikot, Dolakha Town, Makaibari, Mati, Suspaa, and Lankuri Danda. At the time of the 2011 Nepal census, it had a population of 32,486 people living in 8,639 individual households. The town is located at an altitude of 1,554 metres (5,101 feet).

== Boundaries ==
The region is bordered by the Sun Koshi River on the west and the Khimti Khola River on the east. It is divided unequally by the River Tama Koshi and Charnawoti Khola, proportionately two-thirds to the west of the river and one-third to the east.

To the northeast lies the impressive Rolwaling Himal to the western edge of which are such peaks as Gauri Shankar and Melungtse. Gauri Shankar is synonymous with the Hindu deity Shiva and his consort Parvati.

== Geography ==
To the northwest the mountains slope gently downwards towards the ancient pass of Kuti that starts above the Tibetan town of Khasa and follows the waters of the Bhote Koshi from Tibet. The river flows past Kodari and Tatopani (Hot Springs) on the Nepalese side and gradually rushes down into an ever-widening stream of water that becomes the Sun Koshi.

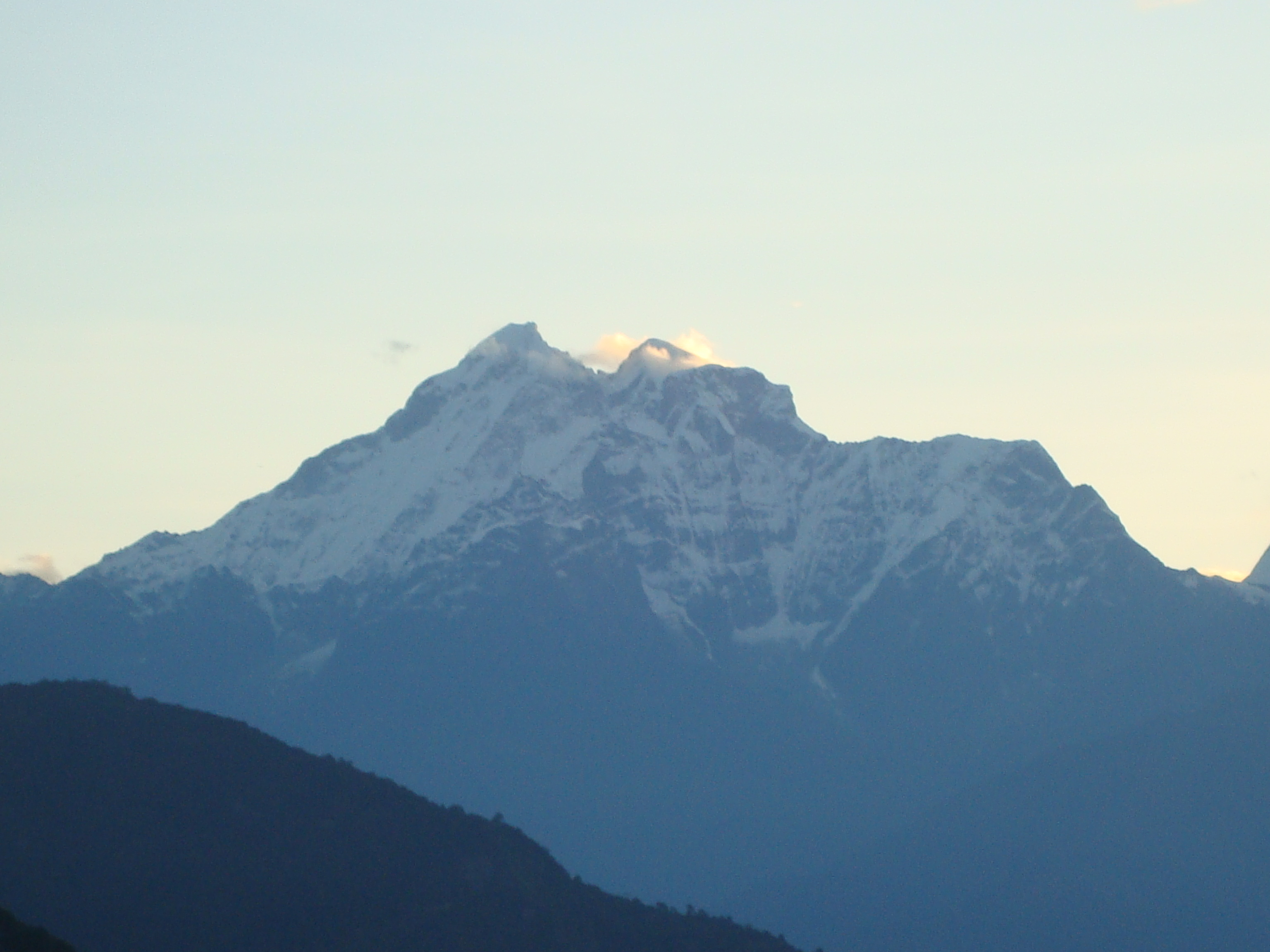
The Gaurishankar Himalaya

The Khimti Khola drains down from a region of five lakes called Panch Pokhari. They have a specific place in legend and go by the names of Mohi (buttermilk), Jata (hair), Dudh (milk), Bahula (insane), and Bhut (ghost). It is believed that if one bathes in Bahula Pokhari one will become insane, whereas the Ghost Lake cannot bear the smell of human perspiration and will pull one inside its murky waters to a certain death if you as much as venture near it. The Khimti Khola joins the Tama Koshi, as do the Khare Khola and Rolwaling Khola to the northeast and the Sangawati, Dolti and Charnewati Kholas to the west.

The riverine valleys open out into massive volcanic folds. Sub-tropical settlements on the banks of rivers boast banana trees, guava, and an abundance of fish. Above the banks hover the terraced fields of paddy, make, wheat, and millet.

Between Bhimeshwor and Jiri the road descends to 845 metres and is bordered by plantations of sugar-cane. Above these slopes are forests of dark oak, fir and pine, interspersed with tangles of bracken and fem all in the embrace of clinging orchids and coloured in the springtime by the rhododendrons, the national flower of Nepal.

Mosses cling to the shaded rocks and in the forests are wild strawberries, loganberries, red berries and thyme.

== Transportation ==
Dolakha is approximately 139 km from the capital of Nepal, Kathmandu. Regular-local and express bus services are available from Jadibuti Bus Park. All the bus services are operated by Araniko Transportation Authority as per Syndicate System.

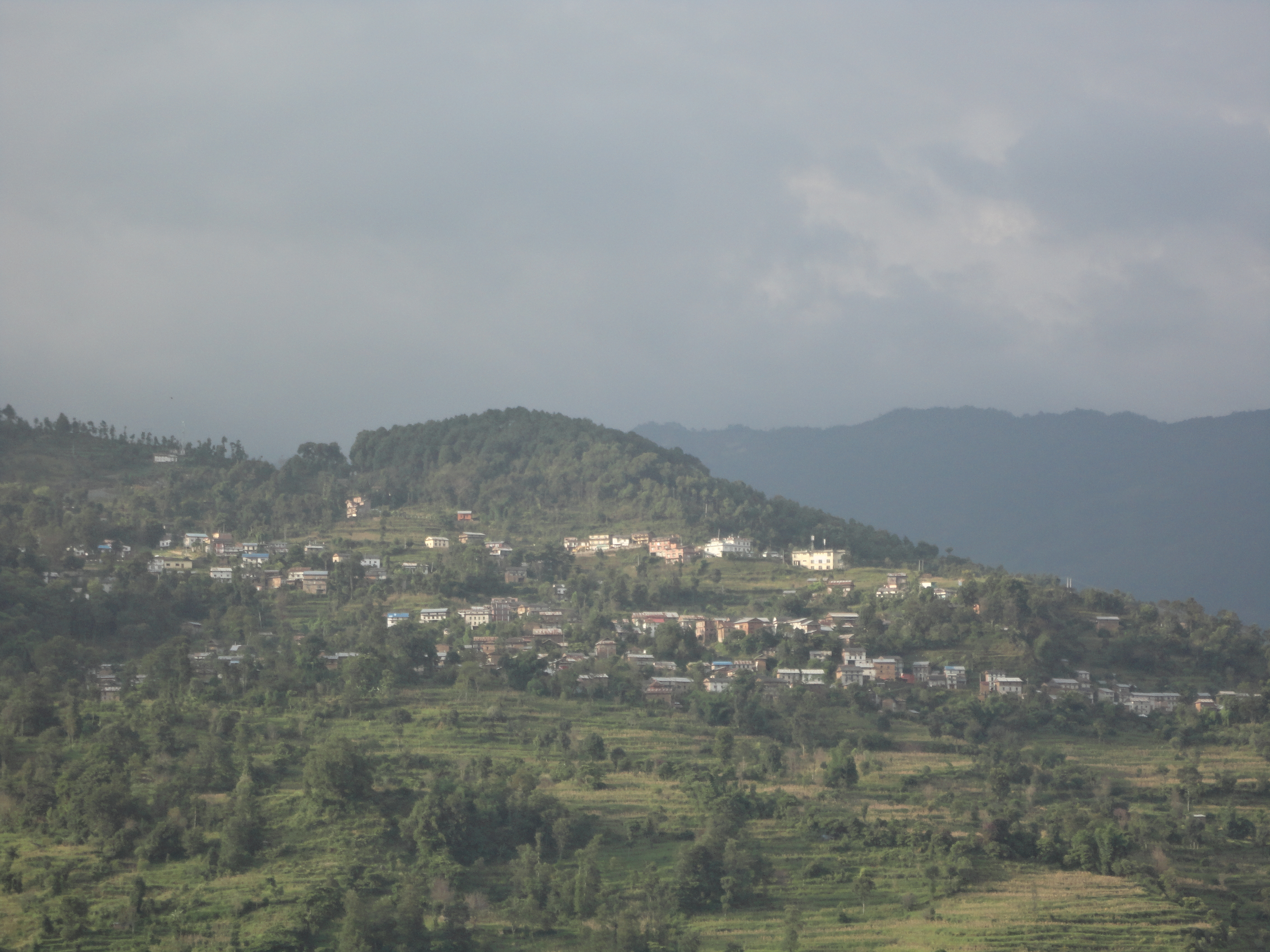
Dolakha bazar

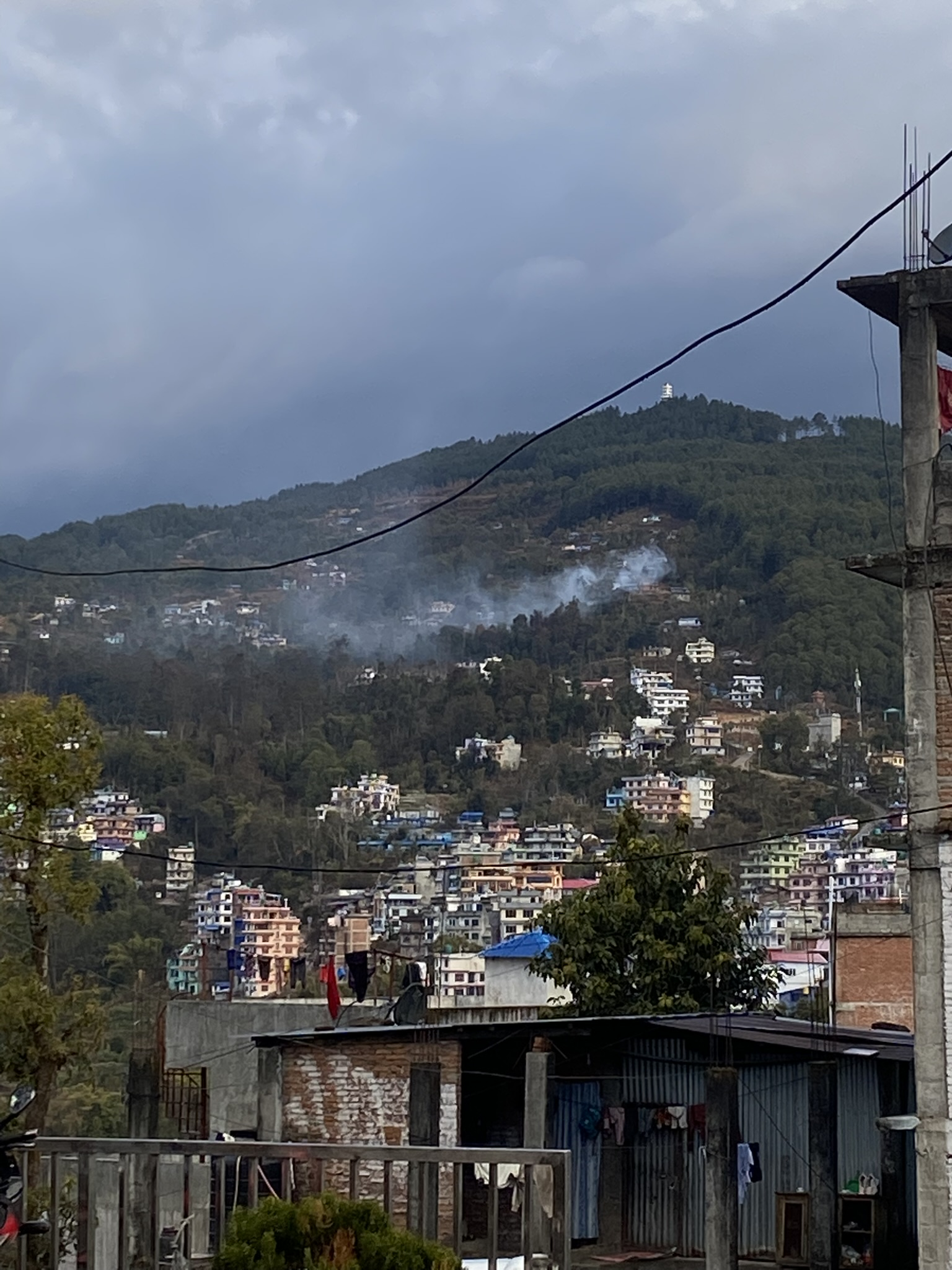
Charikot Bazar

== Schools and colleges ==
=== Government schools ===
- Shree Kutidanda Higher Secondary School (Makaibari)
- Shree Kalinchwok Higher Secondary School (Charikot)
- Shree Pashupati Kanya Mandir (Charikot)
- Shree Bhim Higher Secondary School (Dolakha)
- Shree Sharba Secondary School (Jilu)
- Shree Mahendradayo Higher Secondary School (Mati)

=== Private boarding schools ===
- The Rising Star English Boarding School (Charikot)
- Mount Valley Academy secondary school (Charikot)
- Tripura Glorious Academy (Charikot)
- Samata School
- Apline Public School (Charikot)
- Aankura English Boarding School (Dharam Ghar)
- Gaurishanker English Boarding School (Charikot)
- Apex English Boarding School (Charikot)
- Modern Nepal English School (Charikot)

=== Government colleges ===
- Gaurishankar Multiple Campus (Charikot)
- Charikot Campus (Charikot)

=== Private colleges ===
The Rising Himse Academy (+2) in Management and Tripura Glorious Academy (+2) in Management Mount Valley Academy

== Government offices and hospitals ==
=== Government offices ===
- District Administration Office Dolakha
- Land Measurement and Archive Office Dolakha
- District Survey Department Dolakha
- District Court Dolakha
- District Coordination Committee Office Dolakha
- District Police Office Dolakha
- District Armed Police Office Dolakha
- District Post Office Dolakha

=== Government hospitals ===
- Pashupati Chaulagain Smiriti Hospital
- District Health Post Dolakha
- District Eye Hospital Dolakha

=== Private hospitals ===
- Tsho Rolpa General Hospital and Nursing College
- Dolakha Samudayek Hospital
- Dhulikhel Hospital Dolakha

== Government offices ==
- Bhimeshwor Municipality Office
- District Public Health Office
- Road and construction Office

== Climate ==
Climate data for Bhimeshwar (Charikot), elevation 1,940 m (6,360 ft)
Month	Jan	Feb	Mar	Apr	May	Jun	Jul	Aug	Sep	Oct	Nov	Dec	Year
Mean daily maximum °C (°F)	13.5 (56.3)	15.7 (60.3)	20.1 (68.2)	22.7 (72.9)	23.1 (73.6)	23.4 (74.1)	22.9 (73.2)	23.1 (73.6)	22.2 (72.0)	21.3 (70.3)	17.8 (64.0)	14.7 (58.5)	20.0 (68.1)
Mean daily minimum °C (°F)	1.6 (34.9)	2.9 (37.2)	6.7 (44.1)	10.2 (50.4)	12.5 (54.5)	15.0 (59.0)	15.7 (60.3)	15.3 (59.5)	14.3 (57.7)	10.9 (51.6)	5.6 (42.1)	2.4 (36.3)	9.4 (49.0)
Average precipitation mm (inches)	16.1 (0.63)	23.0 (0.91)	40.9 (1.61)	77.2 (3.04)	158.2 (6.23)	313.4 (12.34)	558.8 (22.00)	529.8 (20.86)	263.9 (10.39)	65.7 (2.59)	11.3 (0.44)	16.4 (0.65)	2,074.7 (81.69)
Source 1: Australian National University
Source 2: Agricultural Extension in South Asia (precipitation 1976–2005)

== Demographics ==
At the time of the 2011 Nepal census, Bhimeshwor Municipality had a population of 33,324. Of these, 67.0% spoke Nepali, 13.7% Tamang, 10.4% Thangmi, 5.9% Newar, 1.2% Sherpa, 0.6% Maithili, 0.4% Bengali, 0.1% Bhojpuri, 0.1% Bhujel, 0.1% Gurung, 0.1% Hindi, 0.1% Jirel, 0.1% Magar, 0.1% Sunwar and 0.1% other languages as their first language.

In terms of ethnicity/caste, 29.7% were Chhetri, 18.1% Newar, 15.6% Tamang, 12.6% Thami, 11.1% Hill Brahmin, 3.4% Kami, 2.0% Gharti/Bhujel, 1.8% Sarki, 1.3% Damai/Dholi, 1.3% Sherpa, 0.5% Magar, 0.3% Sanyasi/Dasnami, 0.3% Thakuri, 0.2% Badi, 0.2% Gurung, 0.1% Terai Brahmin, 0.1% Hajjam/Thakur, 0.1% Halwai, 0.1% Jirel, 0.1% Kathabaniyan, 0.1% Koiri/Kushwaha, 0.1% Musalman, 0.1% Rai, 0.1% Sunuwar and 0.5% others.

In terms of religion, 76.4% were Hindu, 16.6% Buddhist, 5.6% Prakriti, 1.1% Christian, 0.1% Muslim and 0.1% others.

In terms of literacy, 68.9% could read and write, 4.2% could only read and 26.8% could neither read nor write.

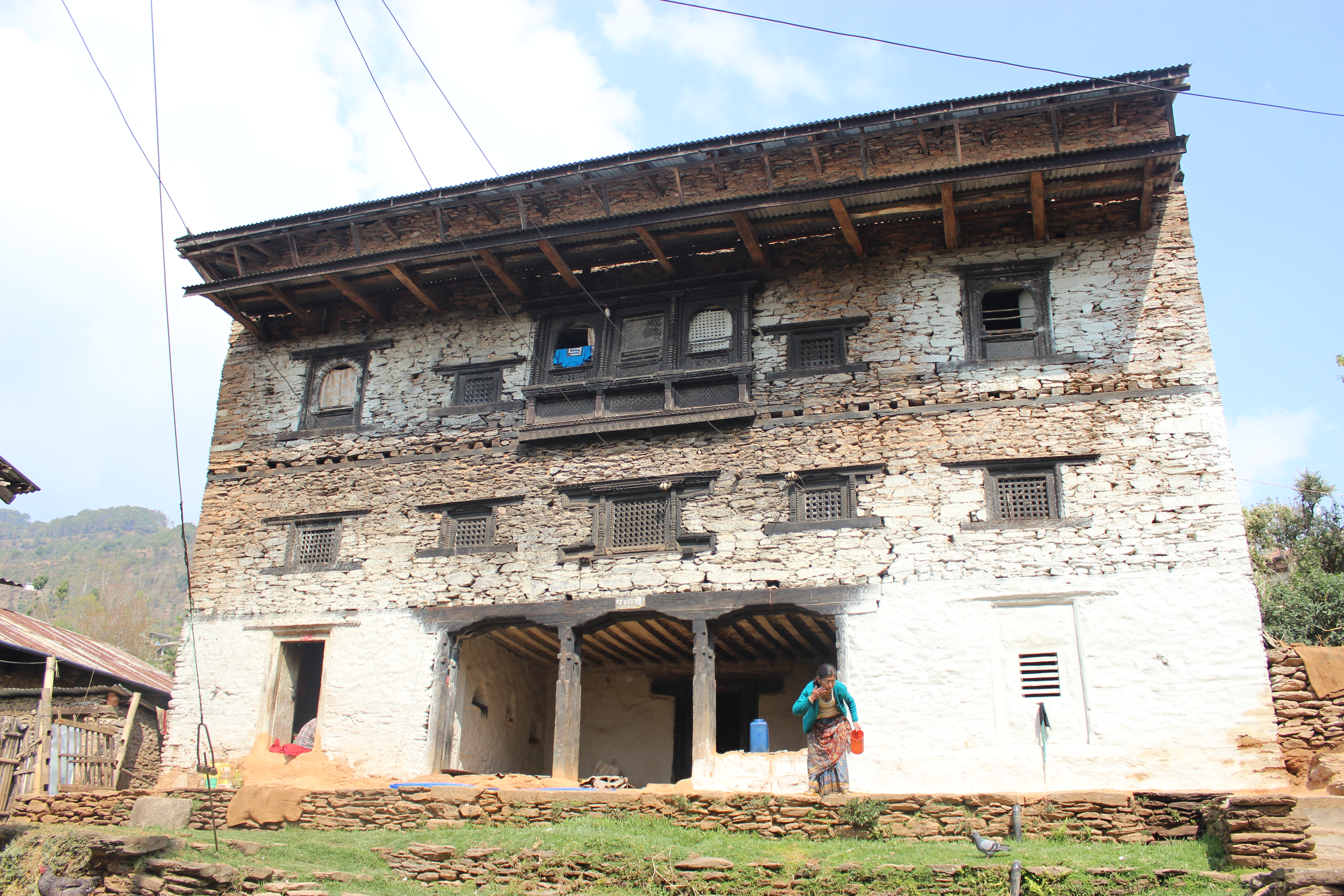
Traditional Newari Dolakhali House

== Media ==
To promote local culture Bhimeshwor has two community radio stations – Sailung (104 MHz) and Radio Kalinchowk (106.4 MHz).
