= Khang Karpo =

Mountain in the Himalayas

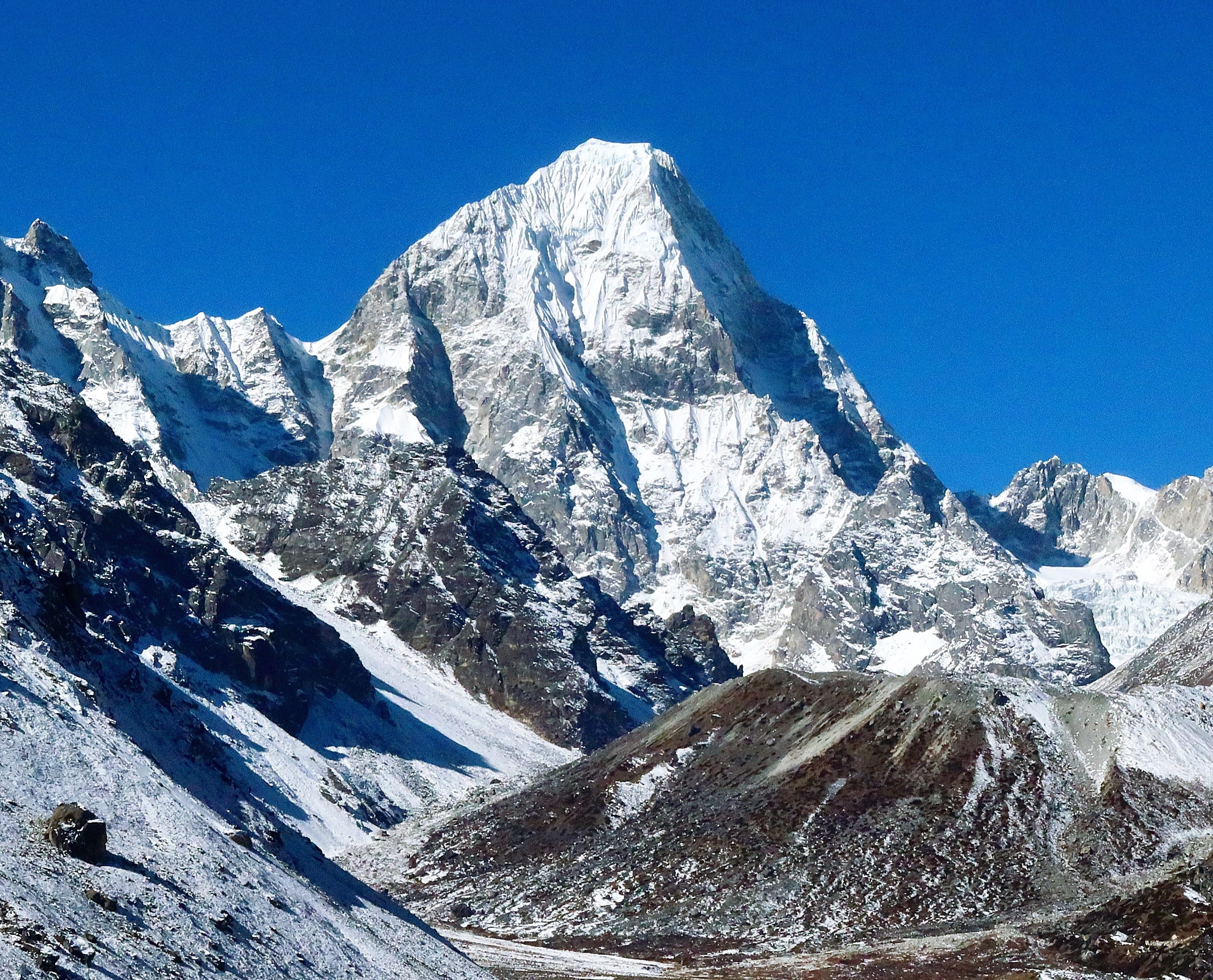
- East aspect

Highest point
- Elevation: 6,646 m (21,804 ft)
- Parent peak: Drangnag Ri
- Isolation: 2 km (1.2 mi)
- Coordinates: 27°57′24″N 86°30′51″E

Geography
- Location within Nepal
- Interactive map of Khang Karpo
- Location: China–Nepal border
- Countries: Nepal and China
- Province: Bagmati / Koshi
- District: Dolakha / Solukhumbu
- Protected area: Sagarmatha National Park
- Parent range: Himalayas; Rolwaling Himal

Climbing
- First ascent: 1952

Khang Karpo is a mountain in Nepal and China.

== Description ==
Khang Karpo is a 6,646-metre (21,804-foot) summit on the western boundary of Sagarmatha National Park in the Himalayas. It is set 1.9 kilometres (1.2 mi) north of Drangnag Ri on the border shared by the Dolakha District, Solukhumbu District, and China. Precipitation runoff from the mountain's north and east slopes drains to the Bhotekoshi River, the southwest slope drains to the Tamakoshi River via Rolwāliṅ Khola, and the northwest slope drains into Tibet. Topographic relief is significant as the summit rises 1,250 metres (4,100 ft) above the Chhule Glacier in one kilometre (0.62 mi). The first ascent of the summit was made in 1952 by Tom Bourdillon and Ray Colledge via Chhule Valley and the north face. There have been five additional ascents including 1955 by Dennis Davis with Peter Boultbee, and in 2022 by Maarten van Haeren with Ethan Berman via the northeast face.

== Climate ==
Based on the Köppen climate classification, Khang Karpo is located in a tundra climate zone with cold, snowy winters, and cool summers. Weather systems coming off the Bay of Bengal are forced upwards by the Himalaya mountains (orographic lift), causing heavy precipitation in the form of rainfall and snowfall. Mid-June through early-August is the monsoon season. The months of April, May, September, October, and November offer the most favorable weather for viewing or climbing this peak.

== Gallery ==
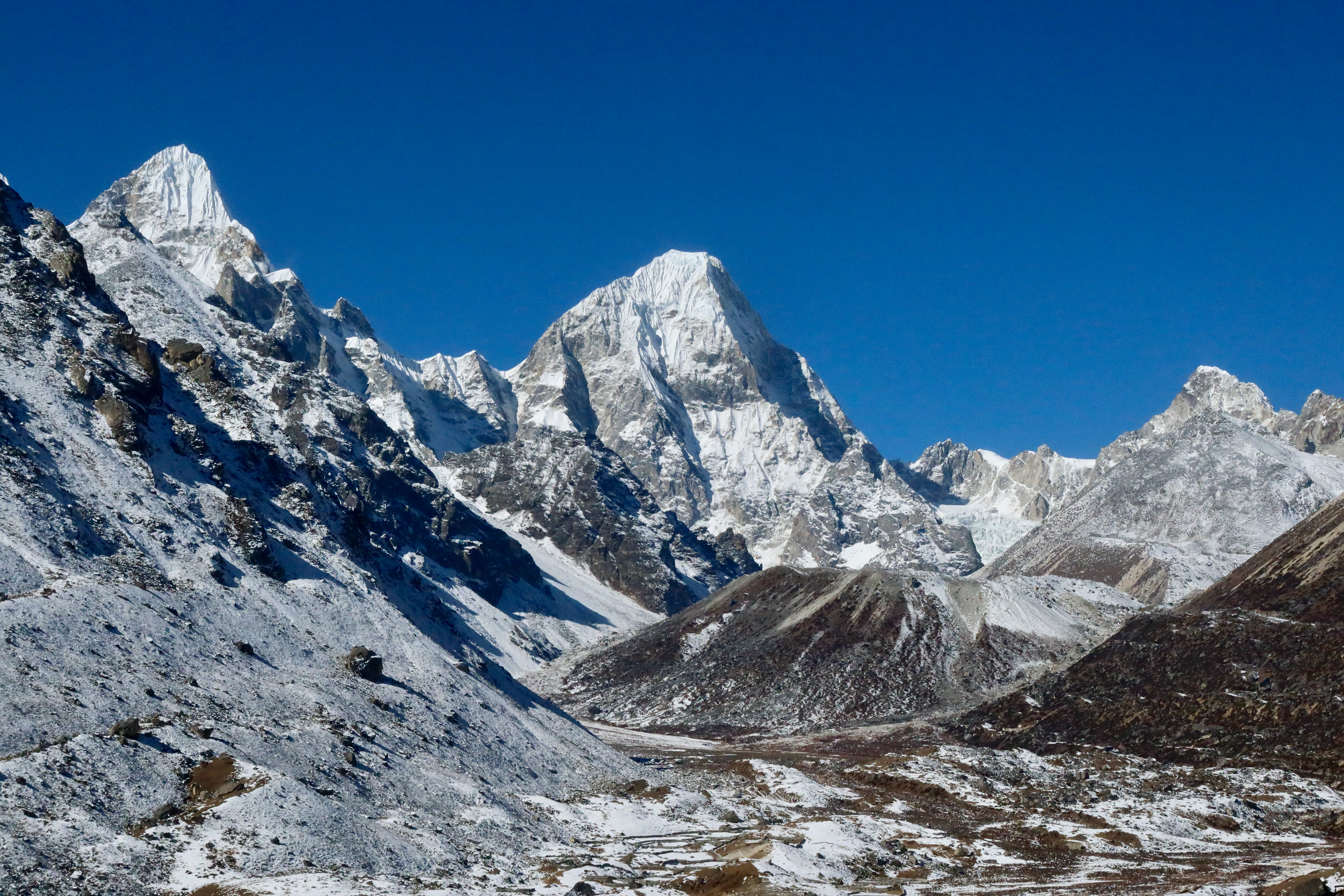
The summit of Drangnag Ri (left) rises behind a ridge. Khang Karpo is centered. View from east.

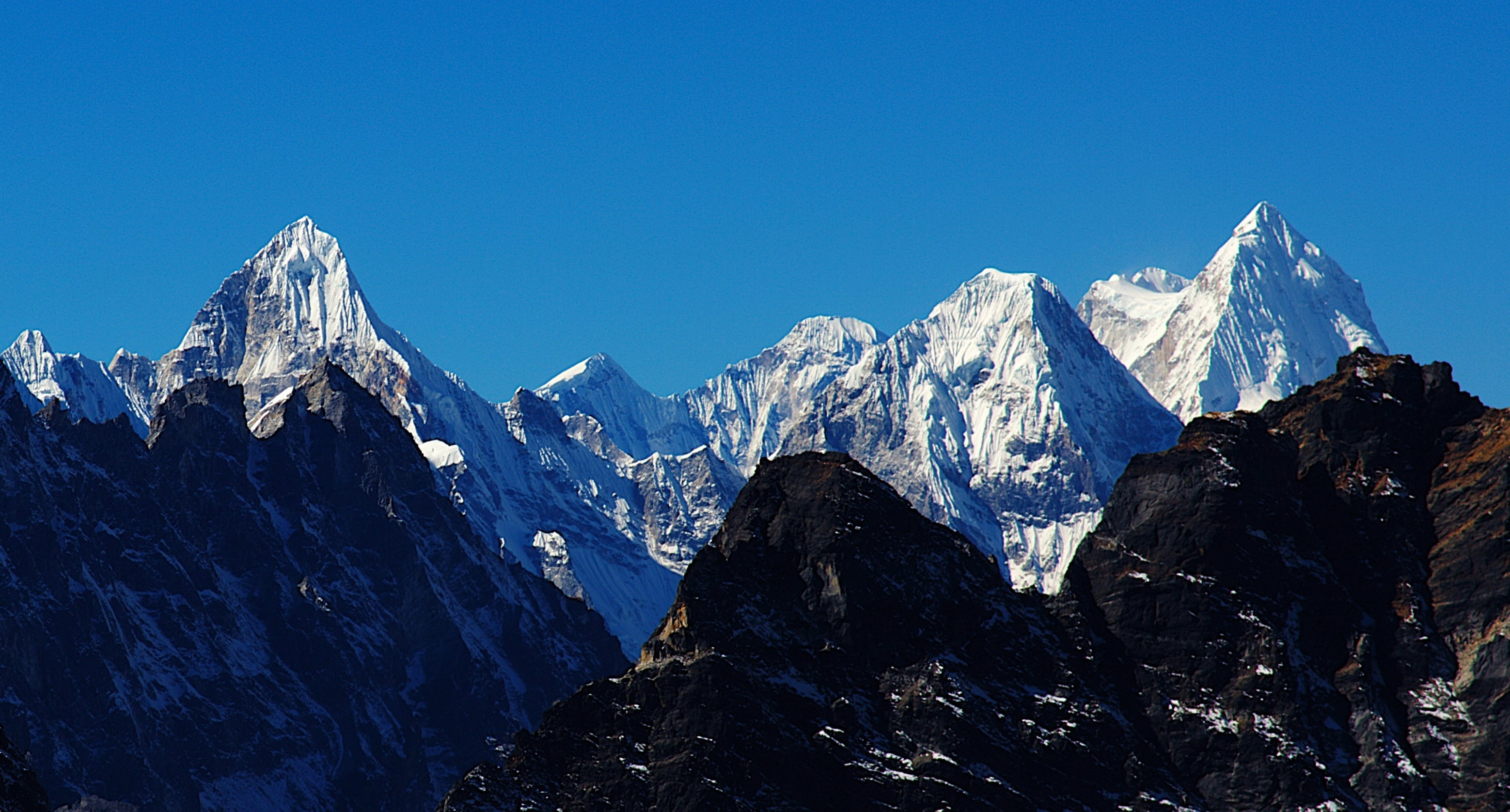
Drangnag Ri (left), Khang Karpo (right of center), and Melungtse (right)

== See also ==
- Geology of the Himalayas
