= Drangnag Ri =

Mountain in Khumbu, Nepal

- Thaknak Ri
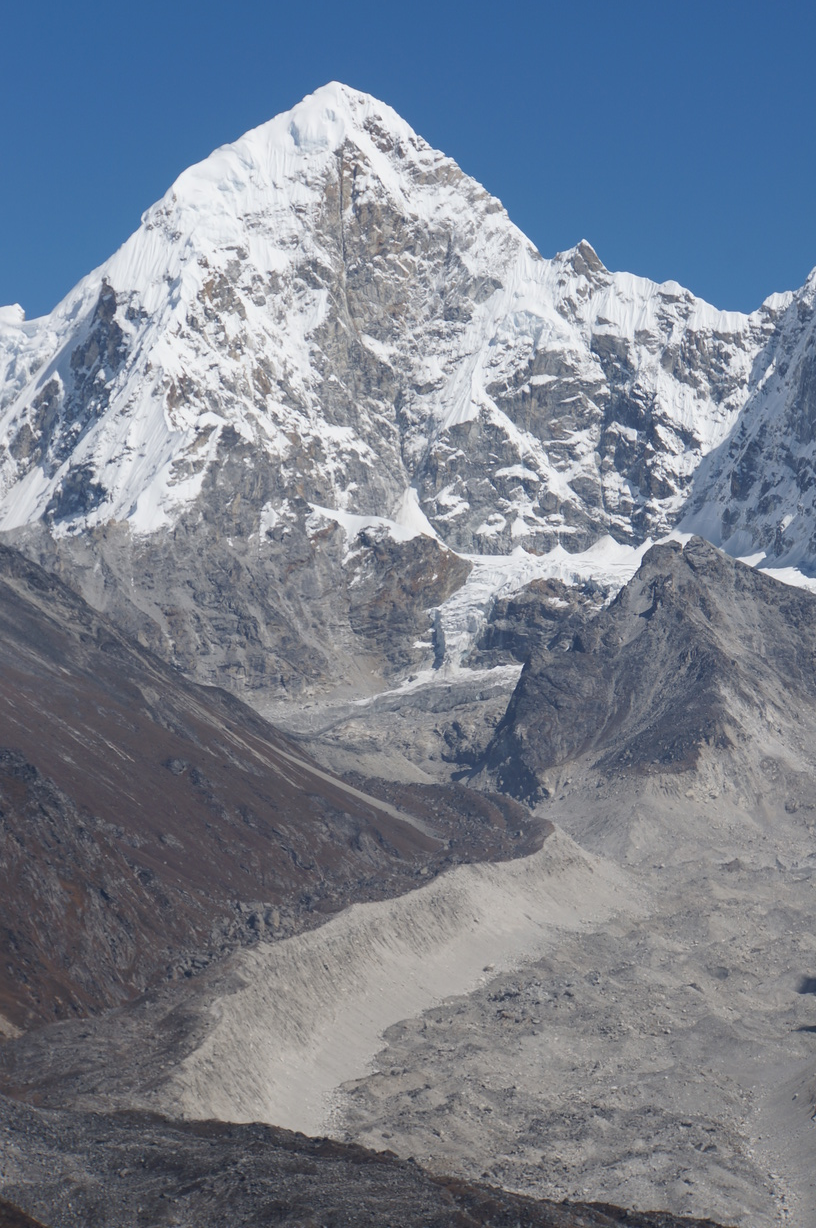
- Southwest aspect

Highest point
- Elevation: 6,801 m (22,313 ft)
- Prominence: 691 m (2,267 ft)
- Isolation: 9.11 km (5.66 mi)
- Listing: Mountains of Nepal
- Coordinates: 27°56′22″N 86°31′27″E

Geography
- Location within Nepal
- Interactive map of Drangnag Ri
- Country: Nepal
- Provinces: Bagmati and Koshi
- Districts: Dolakha and Solukhumbu
- Protected area: Sagarmatha National Park
- Parent range: Himalayas; Rolwaling Himal

Climbing
- First ascent: 1995

Drangnag Ri, also known as Thaknak Ri or Thāngnāk Ri, is a mountain in Nepal.

== Description ==
Drangnag Ri is a 6,801-metre (22,313-foot) summit on the western boundary of Sagarmatha National Park in the Nepalese Himalayas. It is set on the border shared by the Dolakha District and the Solukhumbu District. Precipitation runoff from the mountain's north slope drains east to the Bhotekoshi River, whereas all other slopes drain to the Tamakoshi River via Rolwāliṅ Khola. Topographic relief is significant as the southwest face rises 1,000 metres (3,281 ft) in 0.5 kilometre (0.31 mi).

The first ascent of the summit was achieved on April 30, 1995, by Chris Bonington, Ralph Høibakk, Pema Dorje Sherpa, Bjørn Myrer Lund, and Lhakpa Gyalu Sherpa. While at the summit, the group were caught in an electrical storm as everyone suffered from mild shocks. The second ascent, and first via the west face, was made on May 10, 2005, by Bruce Normand, with assistance from Paul Hartmann (who did not summit).

== Climate ==
Based on the Köppen climate classification, Drangnag Ri is located in a tundra climate zone with cold, snowy winters, and cool summers. Weather systems coming off the Bay of Bengal are forced upwards by the Himalaya mountains (orographic lift), causing heavy precipitation in the form of rainfall and snowfall. Mid-June through early-August is the monsoon season. The months of April, May, September, October, and November offer the most favorable weather for viewing or climbing this peak.

== Gallery ==
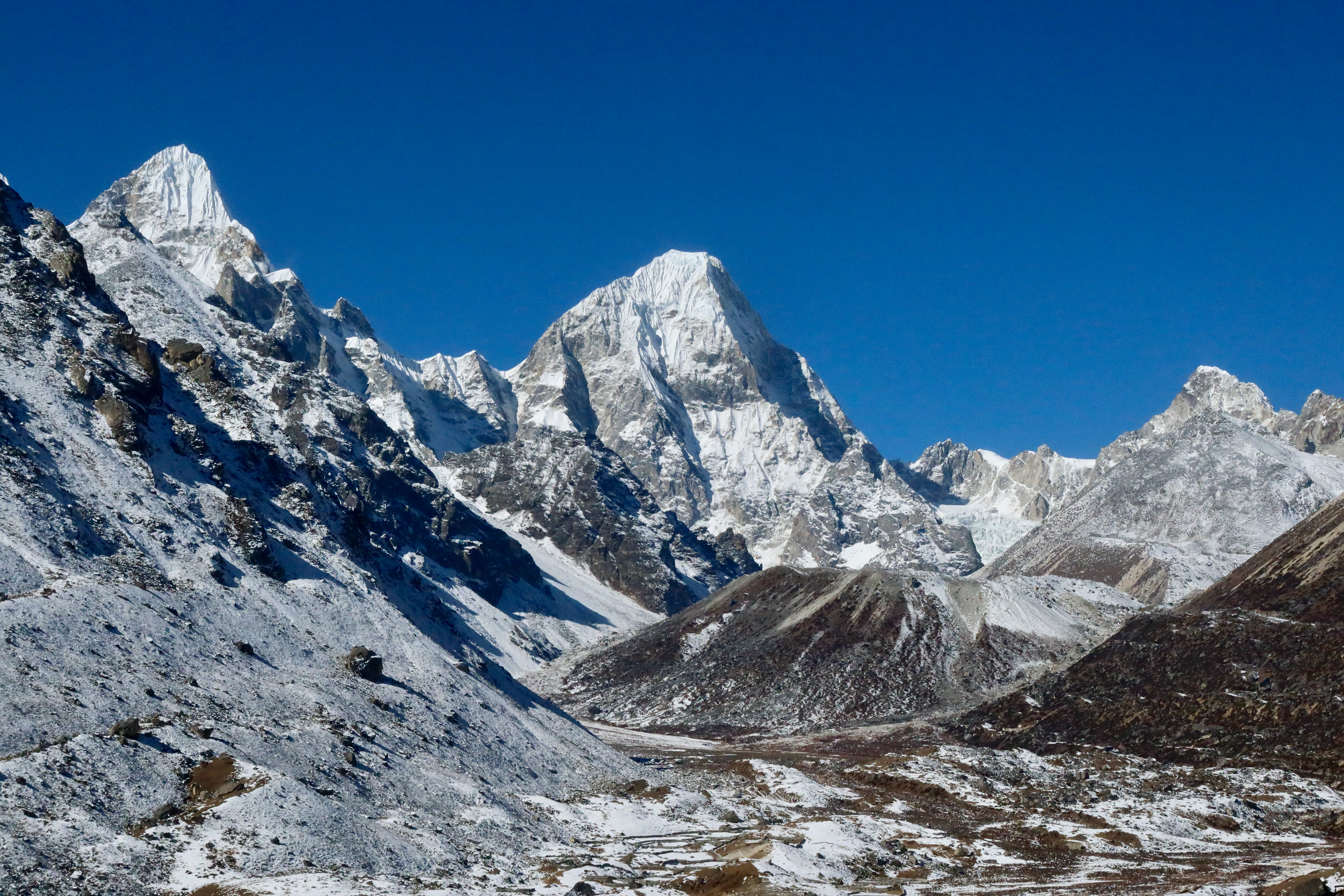
The summit of Drangnag Ri (left) rises behind a ridge. Khang Karpo is centered. View from east.

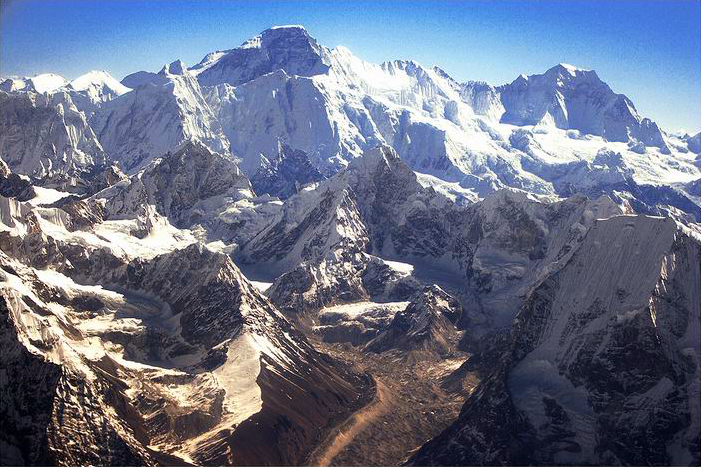
Drangnag Ri centered in frame. Cho Oyu in the distance.

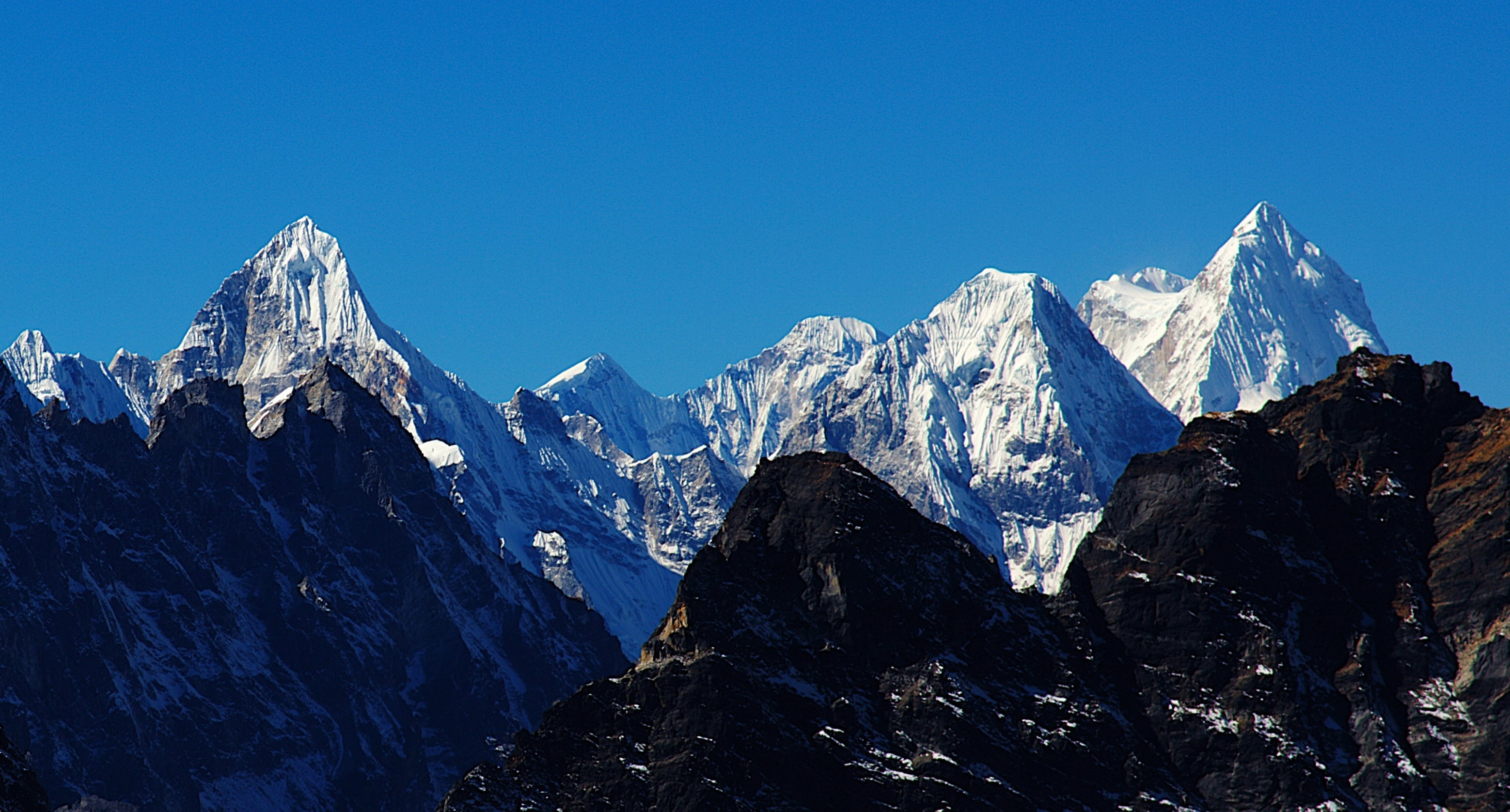
Drangnag Ri (left), Khang Karpo (right of center), and Melungtse (right)

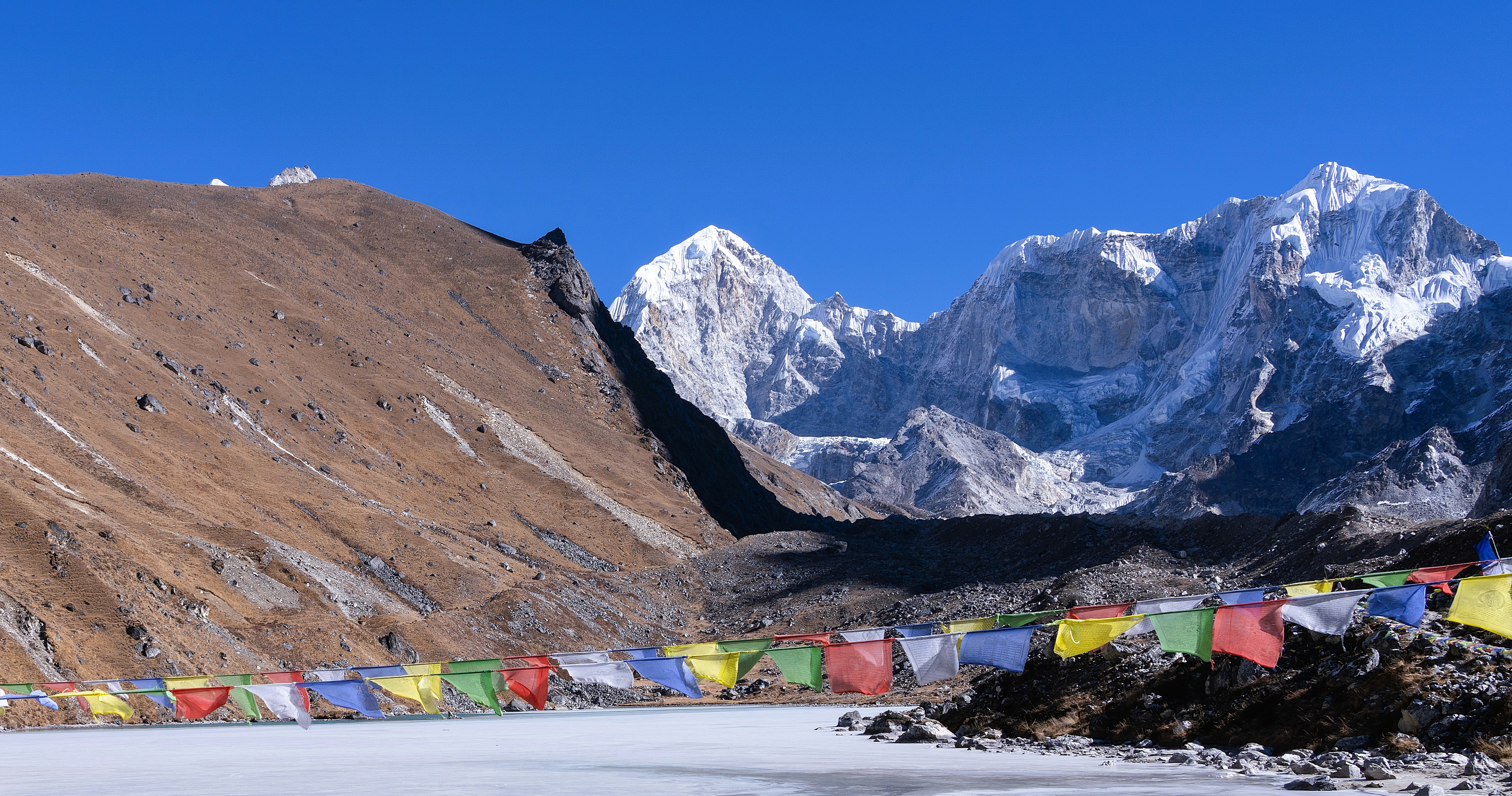
Southwest aspect of Drangnag Ri centered, with Peak 6526 to right

== See also ==
- Geology of the Himalayas
