= Numbur =

Mountain in Nepal

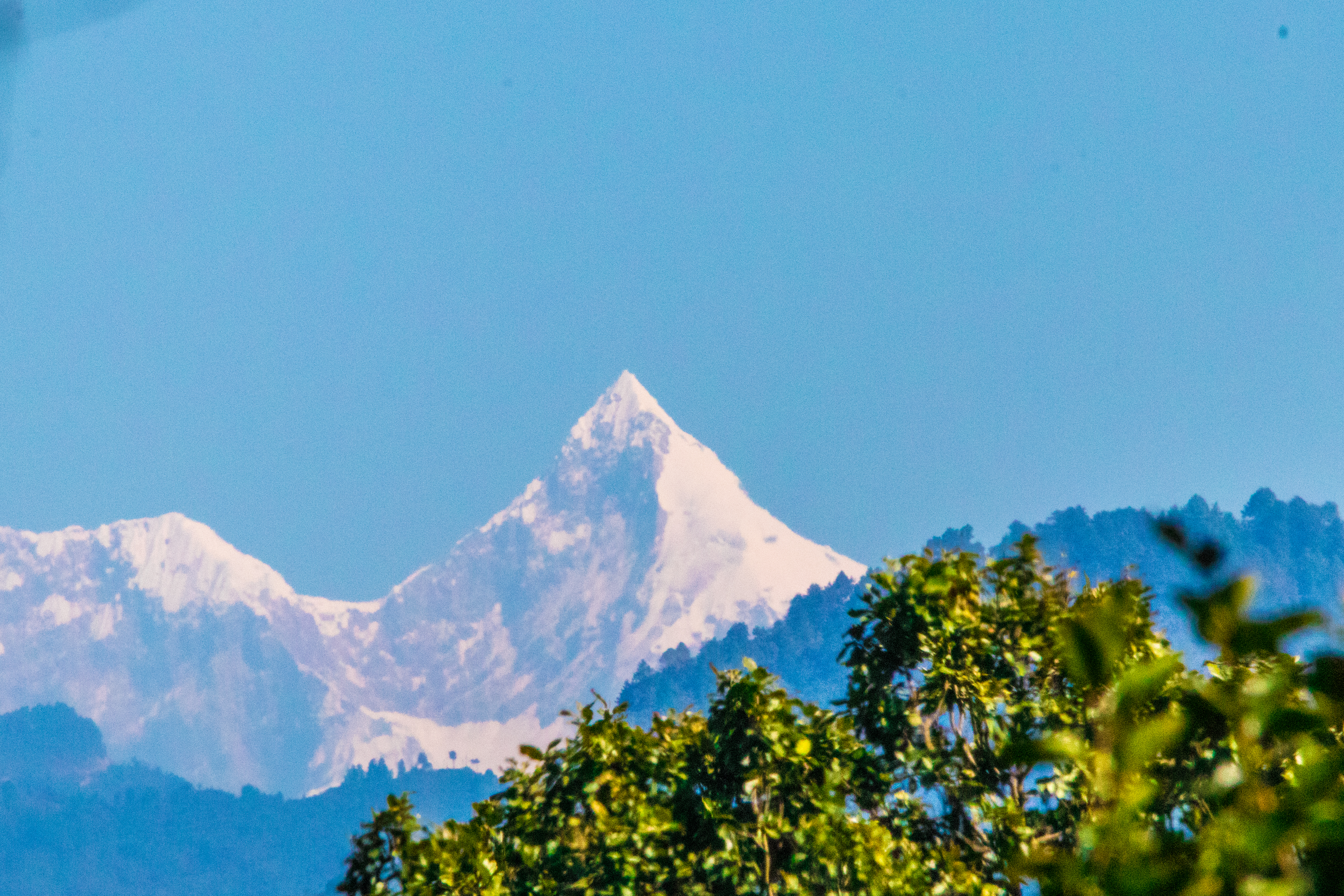
- Numbur seen from Dulalthok, Nepal.

Highest point
- Elevation: 6,958 m (22,828 ft)
- Prominence: 1,238 m (4,062 ft)
- Coordinates: 27°45′16″N 86°34′23″E

Naming
- Language of name: Nepali

Geography
- Location within Bagmati Province Location within Koshi Province Location within Nepal
- Location: Nepal
- Parent range: Rolwaling Himal

Climbing
- First ascent: October 14, 1981 by Jean-Pierre Henry, Christian Rathat and Mingma Sherpa
- Easiest route: snow/ice climb

Numbur is a glaciated mountain located in the Rolwaling Himal mountain range of Nepal. The 6,958 metres (22,828 ft) high Numbur is located at 43 km southwest of Mount Everest, on the border of the Janakpur and Sagarmatha zones. One of its eastern neighbours is mount Karyolung.

== Climbing history ==
The Numbur was first climbed on May 29, 1963, by Hiroshi Matsuo and Mingma Tserin, participants of a Japanese expedition, from the south face.

In October 1981 a French expedition succeeded in the alleged first ascent of Numbur from the southwest ridge. Jean-Pierre Henry, Christian Rathat and Mingma Sherpa reached the summit on October 14, Eric Laroche, Jean-François Le Quang and Philippe Veyrac followed on October 17.
