= List of monuments in Dolakha, Nepal =

This is a list of monuments in Dolakha District, Nepal as officially recognized by and available through the website of the Department of Archaeology, Nepal. Dolakha is a district of Bagmati Province and is located in northern Nepal. Hindu temples are the main attraction of this district.

== List of monuments ==
ID	Name	Type	Location	District	Coordinates	Image
NP-DOL-01	Rajhiti (Tindhara)			Dolakha	27°40′39″N 86°04′34″E	Upload Photo Upload Photo
NP-DOL-02	Bhimeshwar (Bhimsen) Temple			Dolakha	27°40′41″N 86°04′34″E	Bhimeshwar (Bhimsen) Temple Upload Photo
NP-DOL-03	Temple of Dharpa			Dolakha		Upload Photo Upload Photo
NP-DOL-04	Bigu nunnery Monastery			Dolakha	27°50′33″N 86°04′14″E	Bigu nunnery Monastery Upload Photo
NP-DOL-05	Sailung			Dolakha	27°33′18″N 86°01′48″E	Upload Photo Upload Photo
NP-DOL-06	Shyam Narayan Temple			Dolakha		Upload Photo Upload Photo
NP-DOL-07	Tripura Sundari Temple			Dolakha	27°40′40″N 86°04′40″E	Tripura Sundari Temple Upload Photo
NP-DOL-08	Chaitya (Nakchheko Chaitya)			Dolakha		Chaitya (Nakchheko Chaitya) Upload Photo
NP-DOL-09	Swyambhu Chaitya			Dolakha		Swyambhu Chaitya Upload Photo
NP-DOL-10	Pashupati Temple			Dolakha		Upload Photo Upload Photo
NP-DOL-11	Rameshwar Mahadev Temple			Dolakha		Upload Photo Upload Photo
NP-DOL-12	Chaughara			Dolakha	27°42′38″N 85°48′52″E	Chaughara Upload Photo
NP-DOL-13	Baiteshwar Mahadev			Dolakha		Upload Photo Upload Photo
NP-DOL-14	Maga Deurali Devsthaan			Dolakha		Upload Photo Upload Photo
NP-DOL-15	Samtenchhling Monastery			Dolakha	27°50′33″N 86°04′22″E	Upload Photo Upload Photo
NP-DOL-16	Sarwakhaasha Old Monastery			Dolakha		Upload Photo Upload Photo
NP-DOL-17	Chaardhaam Narayansthaan Temple			Dolakha		Upload Photo Upload Photo

== See also ==
- List of monuments in Bagmati Province
- List of monuments in Nepal
