= Karyolung =

- From the left: Numbur, Khatang, Karyolung

Highest point
- Elevation: 6,511 m (21,362 ft)
- Prominence: 831 m (2,726 ft)
- Parent peak: Khatang
- Listing: Mountains of Nepal
- Coordinates: 27°44′00.376″N 86°36′42.98″E

Naming
- Native name: कर्योलुंग (Nepali)

Geography
- Location within Koshi Province
- Country: Nepal
- Province: Koshi
- District: Solukhumbu District
- Parent range: Rolwaling Himal

Climbing
- First ascent: October 1982

Karyolung (Nepali: कर्योलुंग, romanized: Kareluṅ Ḍā̃ḍā) is a mountain located in the Rolwaling Himal range of the Himalayas in Solukhumbu District, Koshi Province, Nepal. It has an elevation of 6,511 metres (21,362 ft) and a prominence of 831 metres (2,726 ft). It is situated between Numbur mountain and Lukla.

== Climbing history ==
A Nepalese-Japanese expedition began in 1982, led by Yoshiyuki Inoue and Yogendra Thapa. After a brief try at the west ridge, they climbed the northern face, where they settled in two camps. Two Japanese and two Nepalese members reached the summit first in October 1982. On the same day, another group consisting of three people reached it, as well as a third group on November 1. After the ascents, the mountain was open to foreign expeditions.

On 31 October 2016, three Spanish climbers climbed the mountain without a climbing permit from the Department of Tourism. The three climbers claimed that they have opened new routes leading to the top of the mountain, with one of them claiming that they climbed it without a permit because they wanted to explore the rest of the region so that they could plan any future climbing. The department took legal action against them, banning them from visiting the country for mountaineering for 10 years. A fine equal to twice the royalty fixed on Mount Everest was also imposed.

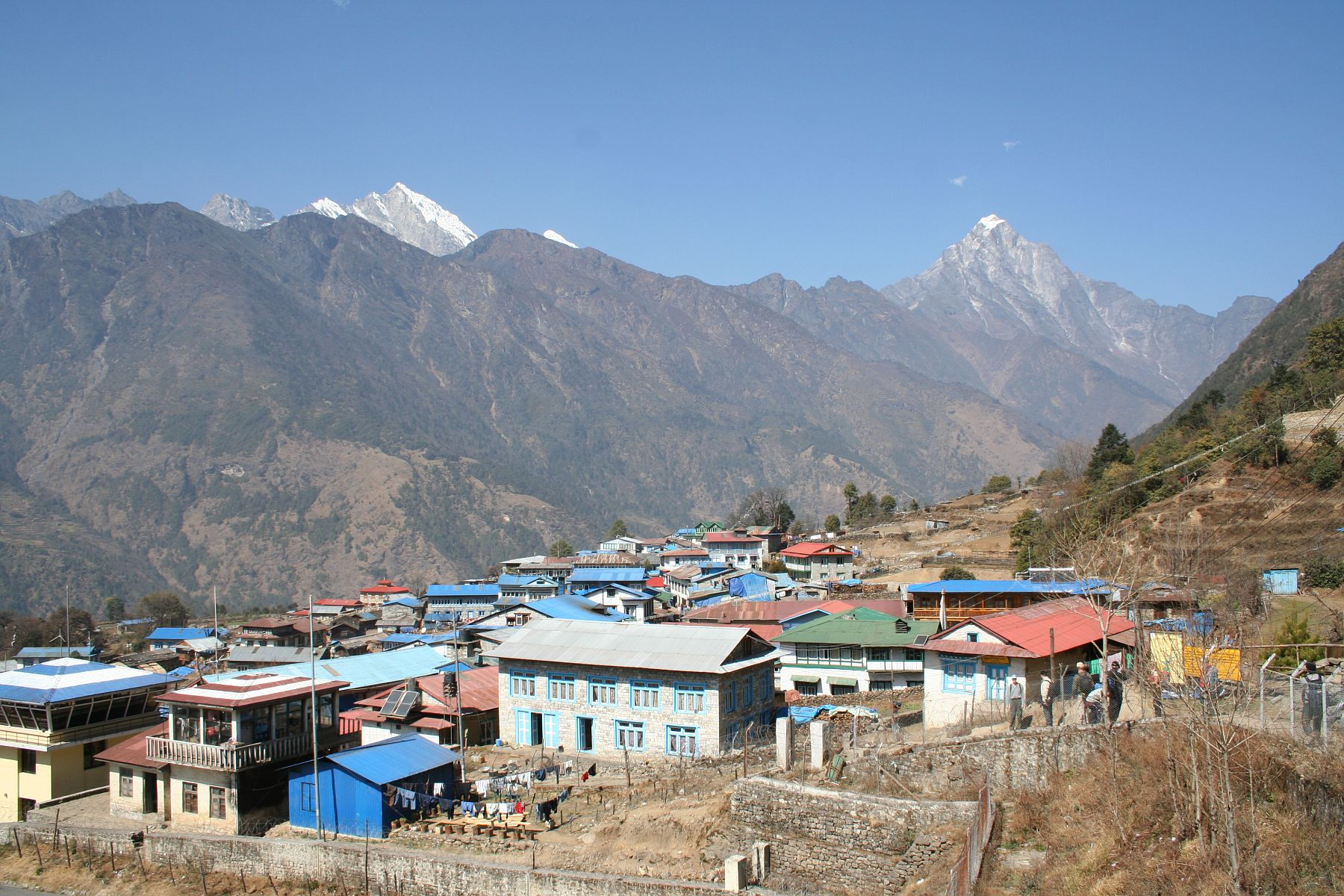
Karyolung (left) from Lukla

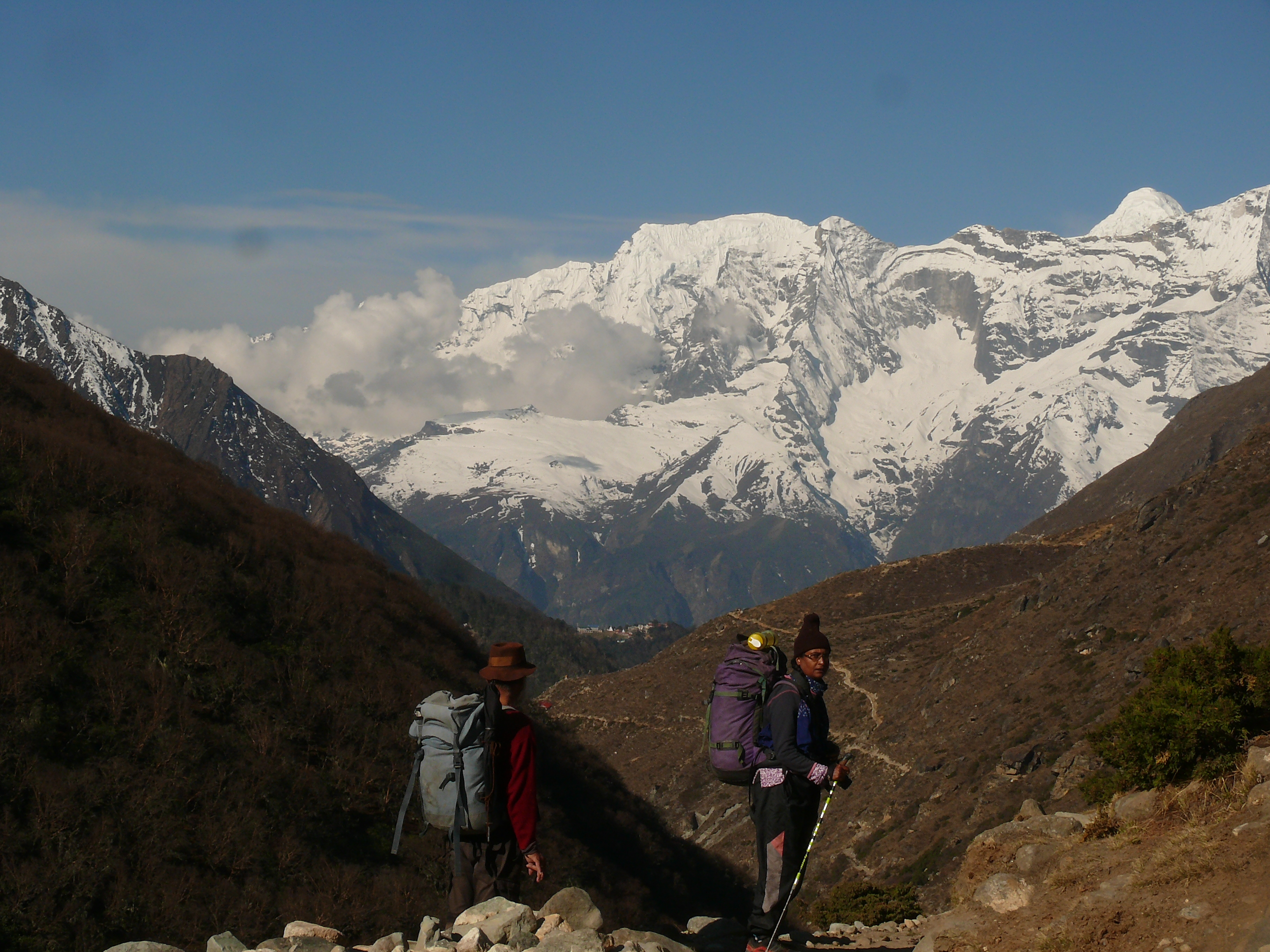
Karyolung (centre) from northwest (between Mount Everest and Tengboche)
