= Amrit Khati =

Amrit Khati अमृत खाती
- Born: November 21, 1983 (age 41); Bhimeshwar, Dolakha, Nepal
- Origin: Nepali
- Genres: Folk
- Occupation: Singer
- Formerly of: Music Royalty Collection Society Nepal (MRCSN)

Amrit Khati (Nepali: अमृत खाती; born November 21, 1983) is a Nepali singer. He has made significant contributions to the Nepali music scene with over 150 songs spanning various genres, including folk, progressive, and modern styles.

== Early life ==
Khati was born in Suspa Kshamawati Village Development Committee (now Bhimeshwar Municipality) in Dolakha District, Nepal.

== Career ==
Khati began his music career with the album "Shirbandi Shirai Ma," a song rooted in traditional folk tunes. "Hamrai Kalinchok," "Oke Chha Ta," and "Jhumke Bulaki" are some of his well-known songs.

He frequently addresses social issues in his music. He also emphasizes themes of patriotism and social justice, as seen in his song "Hamiro Mato," which focuses on the need to protect Nepalese land and heritage. He has been awarded various awards, such as the Bindabasini Music Award.

== Awards and nominations ==
Award	Year	Category	Notable Work	Result	Ref.
International Music Award	2019	Best Male Singer		Won	
Bindabasini Music Award	2015	Best Male Singer	Mulko Panile	Won	
5th Teej Music Award	2018	Best Teej Duet Song Singer	Bachau Ghumi Ghumi	Won	
National Inclusive Music (NIM) Award	2023	Public Choice Award		Won	

== Songs/Music ==
Song name	Release date	Ref.
Manma Timi	2023	
Kerako Paat		
Kaalo Moso Dalau		
Mirmire Sahili	2020	
Hajur ko Aganima		
Hamro Maato		
Damauli ma Get		
Aalu Tamale	2023	
Kamero (Dashain Song)	2019	
Biu Khayo Kiraile	2017	
Mulko Panile	2015	

== Honors ==
Year	Organization	Ref.
2023	Natikaji Rastrya Loksangit Puruskar (honorable President Ram Chandra Poudel)	
