= Siraichuli =

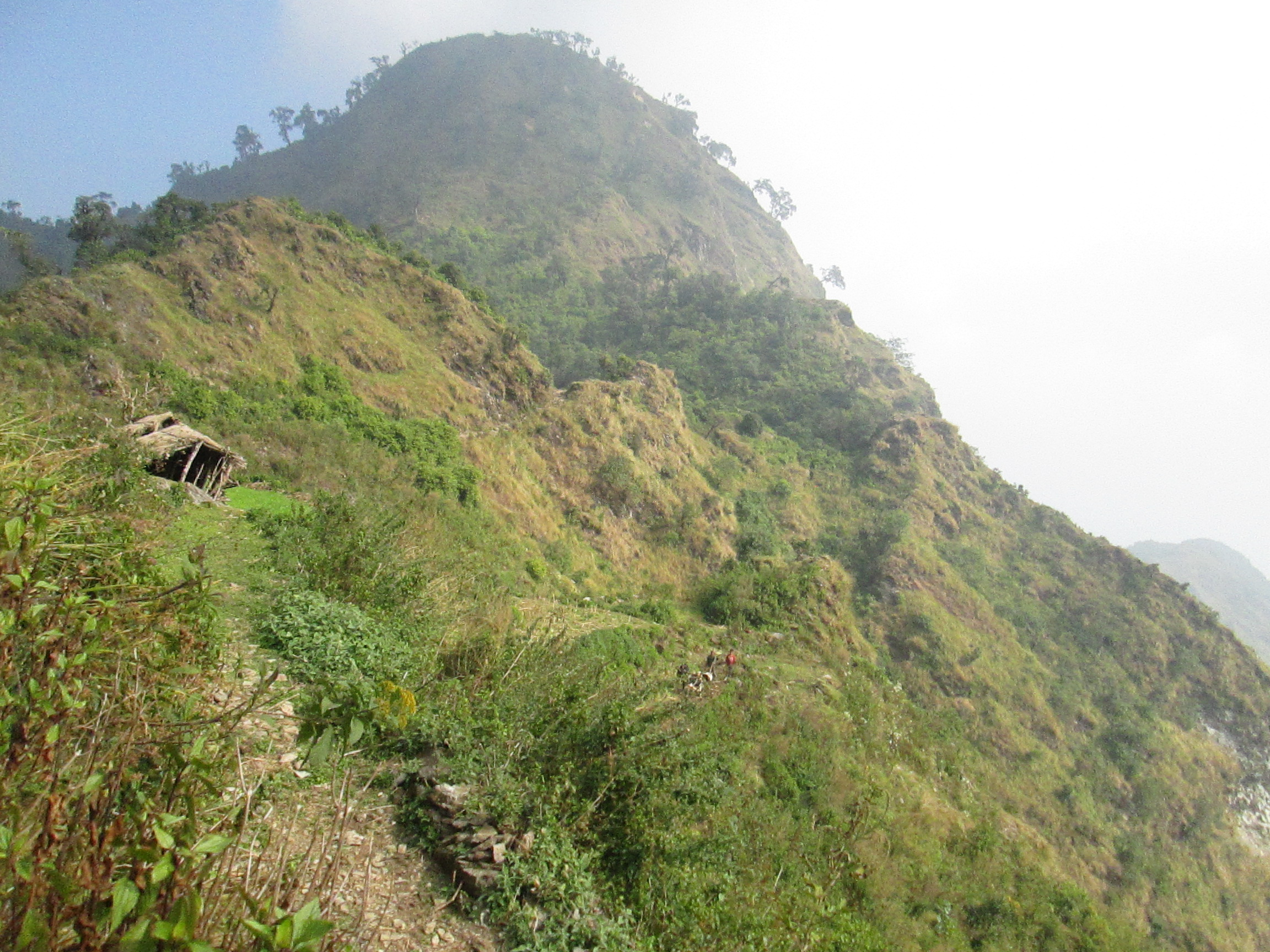
A view of Siraichuli Peak from Chepang Village.

Siraichuli is the highest hill peak of Chitwan District, located in Kaule Village Development Committee in Chitwan District in Narayani Zone of Nepal. The altitude of Siraichuli is 1945 m and it provides views of mountains such as Gausankhar, Dhaulagiri, Langtang, Rolwaling and Manaslu and the Terai belt of southern region of Nepal.
