= Gaurishankar, Dolakha =

Gaurishankar गौरीशंकर
- Rural municipality
- Location in Nepal
- Coordinates: 27.88°N 86.40°E
- Country: Nepal
- Province: Bagmati Province
- District: Dolakha District

Government
  - Chair person: Tshering Sherpa
  - Secretary in charge: Sonam Sherpa

Population (1991)
  - Total: 1,392
- Time zone: UTC+5:45 (Nepal Time)

Gaurishankar is currently referred to as Ward No. 9 under Gaurishankar Rural Municipality in Bagmati Province, Dolakha District of Nepal. At the time of the 1991 Nepal census it had a population of 1,392 people living in 291 individual households. There are divided to 3 villages which are Tasi Nam, Simi Gau and Beding.
