= Ralph Høibakk =

Norwegian entrepreneur (born 1937)

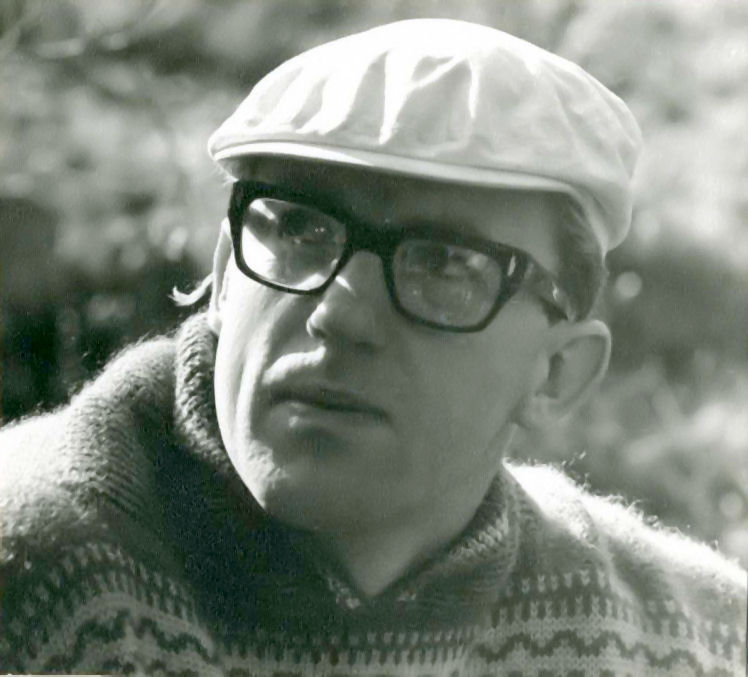
Ralph Høibakk in 1967

Ralph Høibakk (born 14 July 1937) is a Norwegian entrepreneur. He established the Tandberg Data company in 1978, which produced ergonomically designed laptops and keyboards. Høibakk left the company in 1986, and started Høibakk Invest, which provides management consulting for new enterprises. He is also a mountaineer, and has climbed the Tirich Mir, Mount Everest and Drangnag Ri mountains in Asia with Norwegian philosopher Arne Næss and Arne Næss Jr.

Høibakk obtained a PhD in mathematics in 2017 (age 79) at the University of Tromsø.

== Early and personal life ==
Høibakk was born to the engineer Rolf Høibakk (1908–2002) and his wife Mary Wilthil. In 1965, Høibakk married Inger Holm, but divorced her in 1998.

== Career ==
Høibakk grew up at Rjukan and took examen artium in 1956. After that, he studied at the Norwegian Institute of Technology until 1962. He then served his conscription at the Norwegian Defence Research Establishment at Kjeller. During his conscription, he became familiar with the Manchester computer named FREDERIC, which was imported from the University of Manchester.

From 1963 to 1965, Høibakk worked at the SINTEF research centre in Trondheim. After he left SINTEF, Høibakk was appointed managing director of the computer technology company Nor-Data, which he remained for 13 years. In 1978, he was appointed chairman of Tandberg Radio's data division. In the same year the Norwegian Ministry of Trade and Industry decided to bankrupt Tandberg Radio, which was the first time the Norwegian government had decided to bankrupt a company. Høibakk decided to start a new company, Tandberg Data. It gained surplus in the first years, and in 1978 it released its first product; a table computer. In the following years, Tandberg Data produced keyboards and personal computers which were ergonomically designed.

In the 1980s, Tandberg Data tried to start business in the United States, but without success. In 1986, Høibakk resigned from his position in the company, and established Høibakk Invest AS, where he was the managing director. In 2000, he was appointed Professor II at the Narvik University College.

== Mountaineering ==
Høibakk is a noted mountaineer. In 1958, he was part of the first climbing of Trollryggen. He also climbed the mountain Tirich Mir in an expedition led by the Norwegian philosopher Arne Næss in 1964. In 1985, Høibakk climbed the Mount Everest with a group of 25 Norwegians, led by Arne Næss Jr. Ten years later, Høibakk climbed the Drangnag Ri mountain in Tibet with Chris Bonington and Bjørn Myhrer Lund. Høibakk and Bonington were hit by lightning at 6,800 metres (22,300 ft) above sea level. In 1990, Høibakk skied to the South Pole with a group of Norwegians who were the first Norwegians to reach the South Pole on ski since Roald Amundsen. He later recalled that he found the ski trip a "bit boring".

== Works ==
- Opp stupet til østtoppen av Tirich Mir. 1964.
- Utvikling av on-line systemer. 1974.
- Sydpolen på tvers. Den norske Sydpolekspedisjonen 1990. 1991.
- Mine fjelleventyr. 1994.
- Drangnag Ri, det hellige fjellet. 1995.

== See also ==
- List of 20th-century summiters of Mount Everest
