= UTC+05:40 =

Former time zone

UTC+05:40 is an identifier for a time offset from UTC of +05:40. It is not currently used in any region in the world, but it was formerly used in Nepal.

== History ==
UTC+05:40 was sometimes used as an approximation for Nepal Time, which until 1920 was based on Kathmandu mean time, which is at 85°19'E or UTC+05:41:16.

Since 1986 AD (2043 BS) Nepal Time is UTC+05:45.
