= Andy Fanshawe =

British mountain climber

Andy Fanshawe (1963 in Cheshire – Lochnagar 1992) was a British mountaineer.

== Biography ==
He started climbing as a student at Wilmslow County Grammar School for Boys. Whilst studying geology at Imperial College London, he led his first expedition to the Ecuadorian Andes where he made first British ascents within the El Altar massif as well as assisting David Kirke of the Dangerous Sports Club glide from the summit of Chimborazo. In 1986, he was made a National Officer of the British Mountaineering Council. Shortly after his appointment, he led a bold traverse of Chogolisa and Bride Peak in the Karakoram which was later documented in his book Coming Through. The book also gave an account of his ascent of Menlungtse with Chris Bonington and Alan Hinkes in 1988. Other climbing achievements included winter ascents of the Croz Spur on the Grandes Jorasses and the Eiger North Face.

On 14 March 1992, he fell while climbing Eagle Ridge in Lochnagar, the Cairngorms, claiming his life. At his funeral, Chris Bonington gave the eulogy.

His book Himalaya Alpine-style, co-authored with Stephen Venables, was published after his death in 1995.

== The Andy Fanshawe Memorial Trust ==
His widow Caroline and a group of friends established The Andy Fanshawe Memorial Trust after his death which provides grants to allow disadvantaged young people to experience the outdoors. The Trust also acts as a memorial to Jane Thomas, who died in the Cairngorms in 1994.

== Notable ascents ==
- 1988 Menlungtse West (7023 m) FA via West Ridge. Summit attained with Alan Hinkes (UK), with Chris Bonington (UK), David Breashears and Steve Shea (both USA) in support.
