= Tasi Nam =

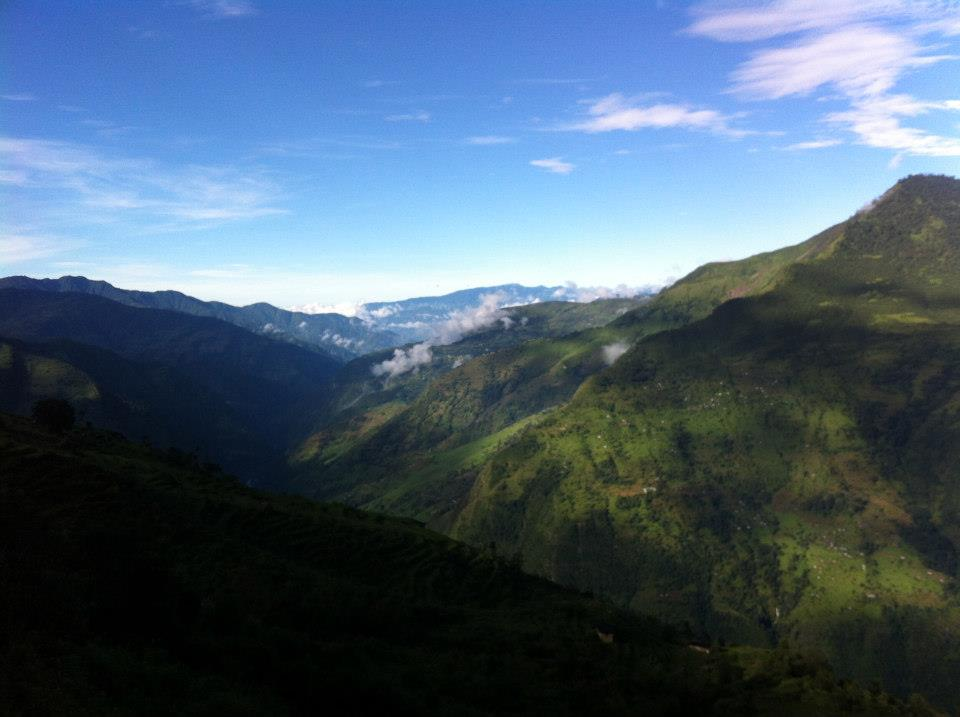
Tasi Nam

Tasi Nam or (Tashi Gau actual name) is the largest village of Gauri Sankar (Rural municipality) at Dolakha District, Nepal, population of 700. Ethnic groups such as Sherpa, Magar, Gurung, Kami, Newar, Thakuri, Tamang inhabit this place. Tashi Nam is the main gateway to the Rolwaling valley and one of the gateways to Mount Everest. Tasi Nan is rich in Ophiocordyceps sinensis. Hydroelectric power is produced in upper Tamakoshi and in the Siprin Khola.

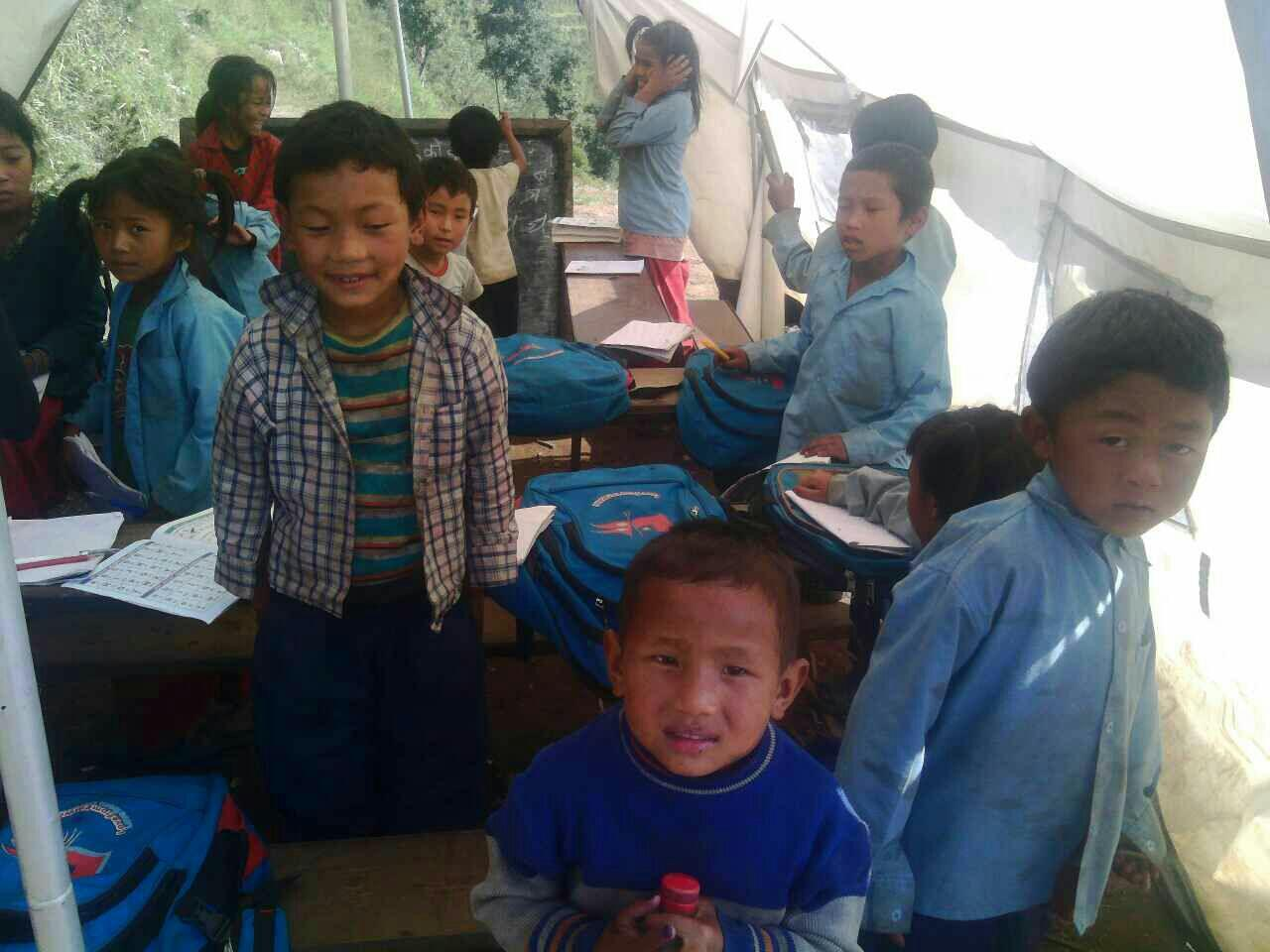
Student of Tasi Gau have to study in tents after schools were destroyed in recent earthquakes.
