= Dolakha Bhimsen Temple =

Temple in Bhimeshwar, Nepal

Dolakha Bhimsen Temple (Dwalkha Bhindyo)
- दोलखा भिमसेन मन्दिर (Dolakha Bhimsen Mandir) द्वाल्खा भिन्द्यो (Dwalkha Bhindyo)
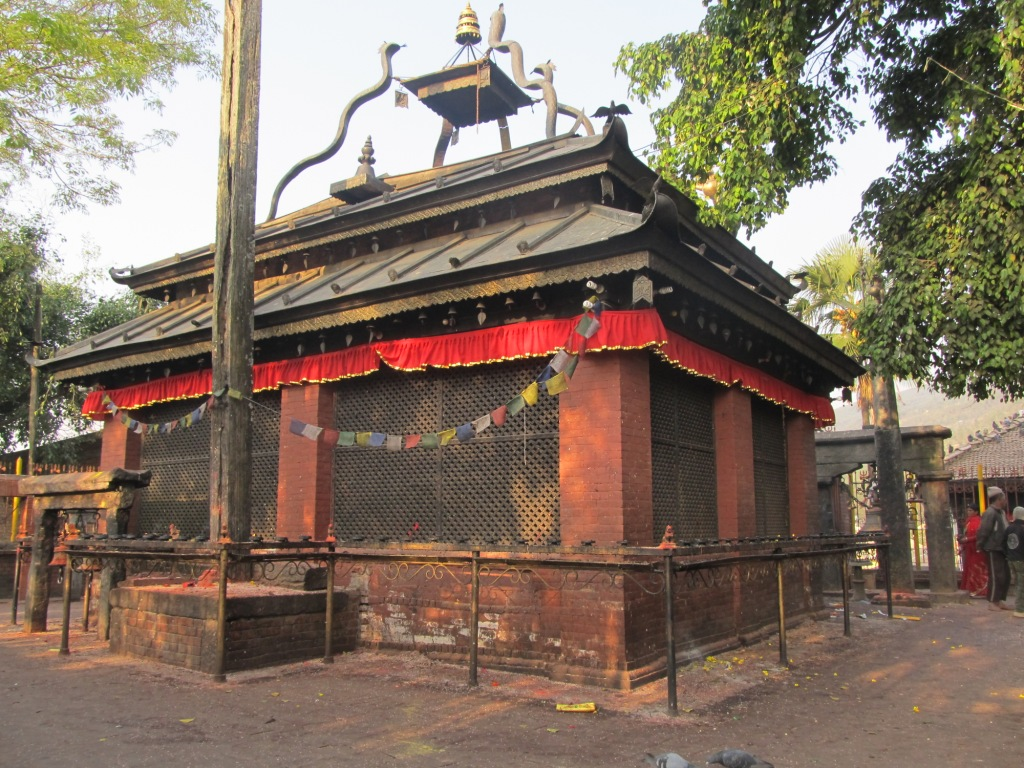

- Location in Nepal

Religion
- Affiliation: Hinduism
- District: Dolakha District
- Deity: Bhimsen

Location
- Country: Nepal
- Interactive map of Dolakha Bhimsen Temple (Dwalkha Bhindyo)
- Coordinates: 27.649°N 86.0892°E

Dolakha Bhimsen Temple (Nepali: दोलखा भिमसेन मन्दिर) is located in the Bhimeshwar municipality of Dolakha in Nepal, approximately 4.5 km (2.8 mi) east of Charikot. The temple is roofless in the center and it houses a triangular-shaped stone idol of Bhindyo, the patron god of trade, commerce and of fortunes. The Newar community in general and the business community in particular revere the deity for good business. The idol is believed to resemble three deities: Bhimeshwar in the morning, Mahadeva throughout the day, and Narayana in the evening. The temple attracts around 5,000 worshippers every week.

== Mythology ==
The temple is dedicated to Bhimsen, also known as Bhindyo in the Newar community, where he is worshipped as the god of trade, commerce, and fortune. There are varying beliefs about his identity. Some view Bhimsen of the Dolakha temple as distinct from the Bhimsen of the Mahabharata, one of the five Pandava brothers. However, local traditions and historical references suggest that these two figures may indeed be the same. According to these beliefs, the Pandavas, during their twelve years of exile, spent time in Dolakha, and Bhimsen is honored in the region to this day. This dual perspective acknowledges both the Newar community's worship of Bhindyo as a patron deity and the association of this Bhimsen with the legendary warrior of the Mahabharata.

According to local legend, twelve porters made a three-stoned stove to cook their rice near a temple. When they noticed that only one side of the rice was cooked, they flipped the rice over. As the cooked rice came in contact with the triangular-shaped black stone, it turned raw. One of the porters got angry and hit the stone with his ladle. The stone cracked and bled blood-coated milk. The porters realized that the stone was Bhimsen's.

== History ==
The exact date of establishment is unknown. An inscription dated 1611 AD mentions the renovation of the temple.

== Sweating of idol ==
The Bhimsen's statue perspires in the form of fluid-like drops from time to time. The perspiration is considered a bad omen for the country. It is believed that Bhimsen himself tries to protect his people by warning them through sweating. Historically, when such an event occurred, the priest soaked the sweat in cotton and sent the cotton to the royal palace. In return, the king would send two goats and a sum of money to clear away the misfortune. This custom has been discontinued after significant political changes within Nepal. Some of the sweating events include:

- During the change of the Rana regime, in 2007 BS, the idol is believed to have sweated.
- The idol is reported to sweat in 1934 before a devastating earthquake that killed 8,500 people.
- It was reported that the idol sweated a few days ahead of royal massacre that killed King Birendra and his family.
- The idol was reported to sweat on 20 February 2020. The incident was reported to President of Nepal and atonement rituals were carried out.

== Gallery ==
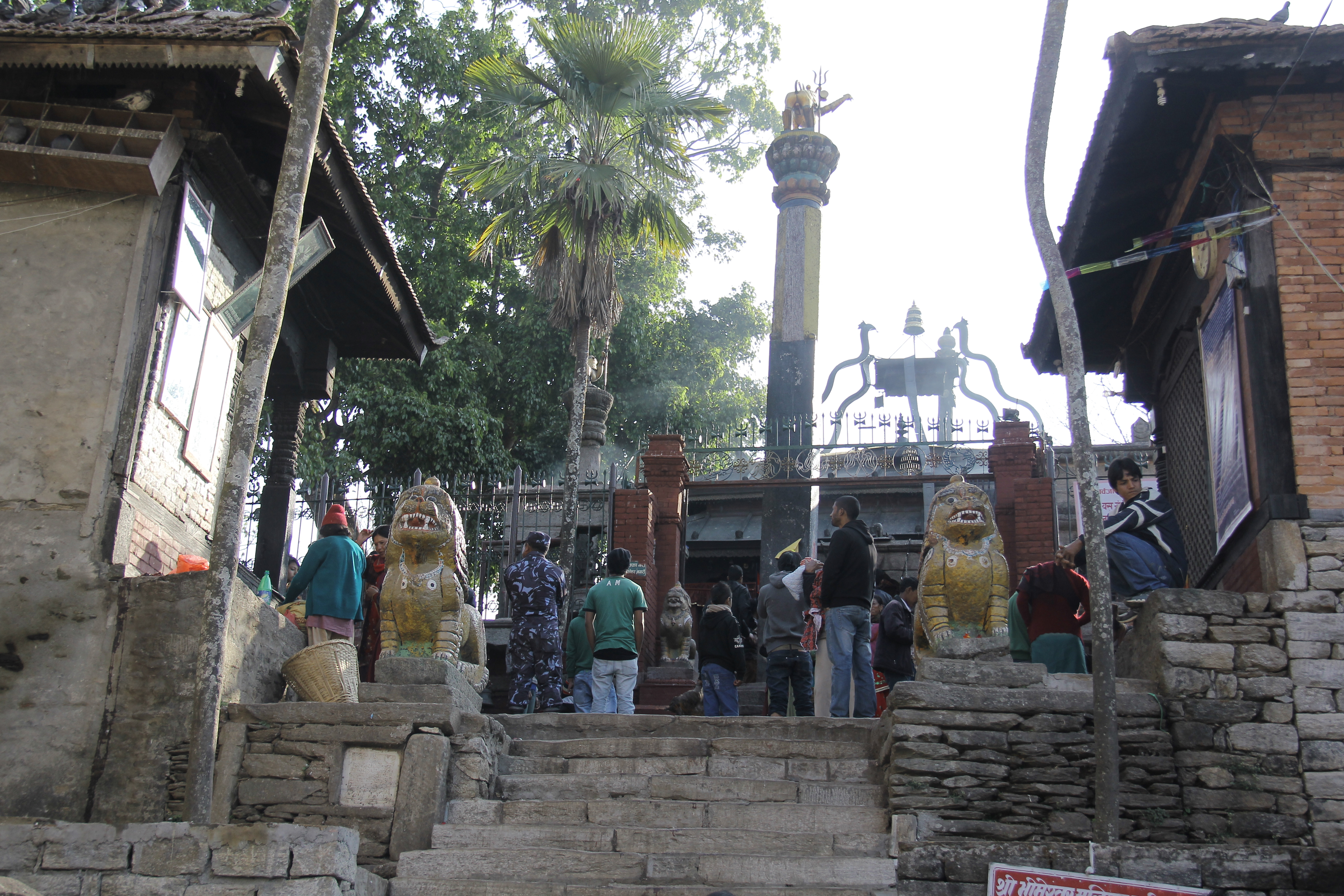
Entrance

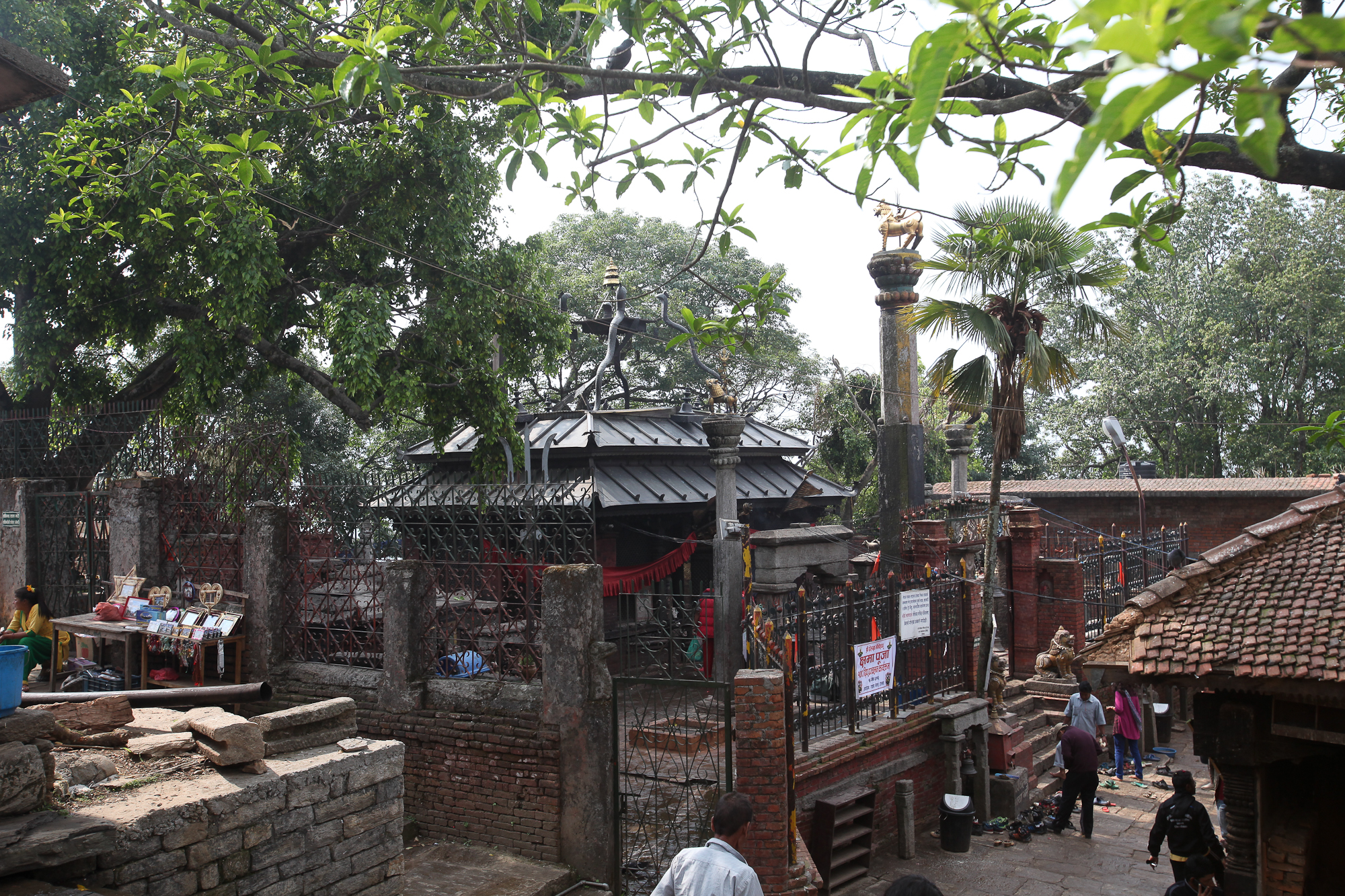
Main view

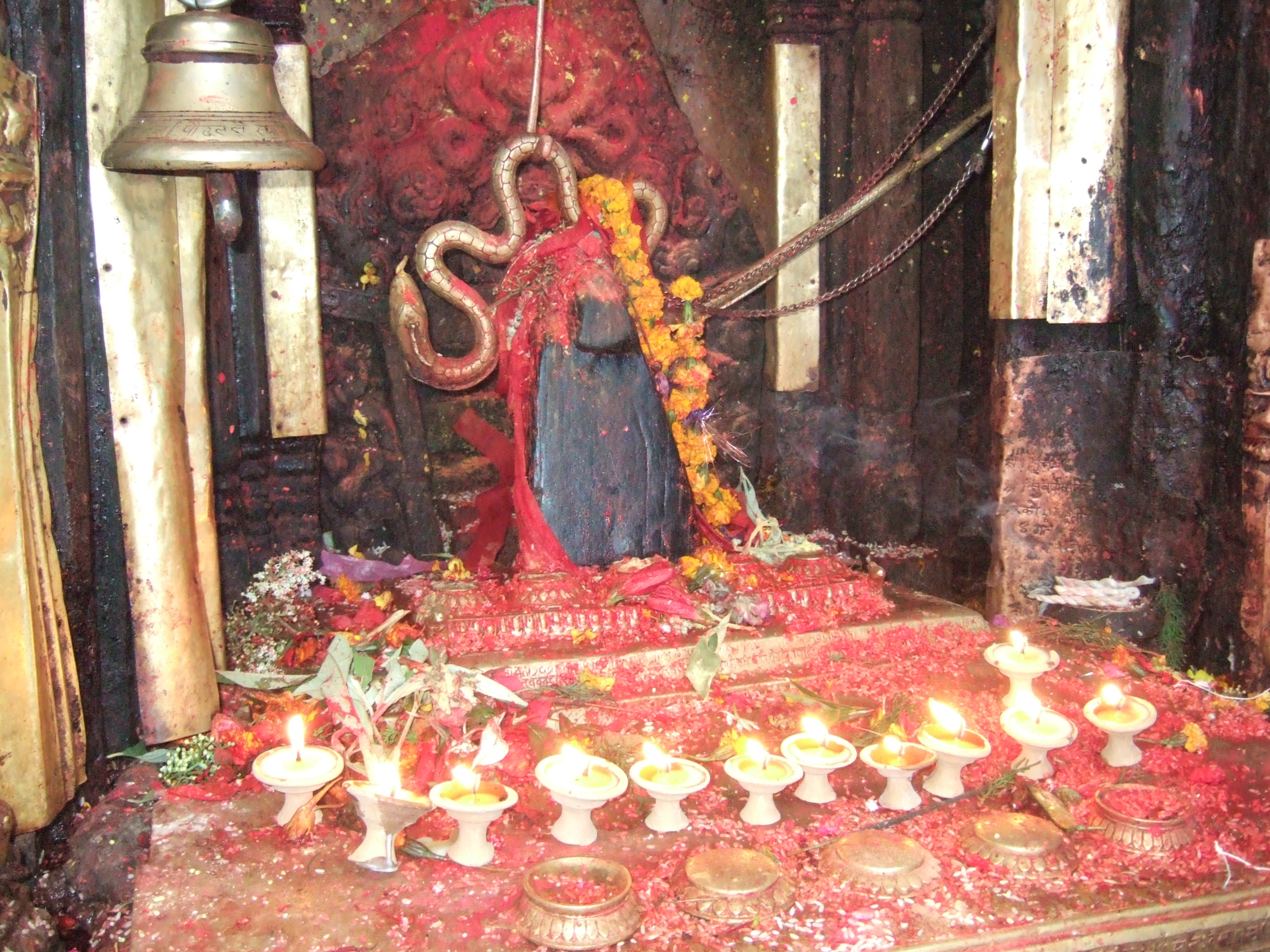
Statue inside the temple

== See also ==
- List of Hindu temples in Nepal
