= Gaurishankar =

Mountain in the Nepal Himalayas

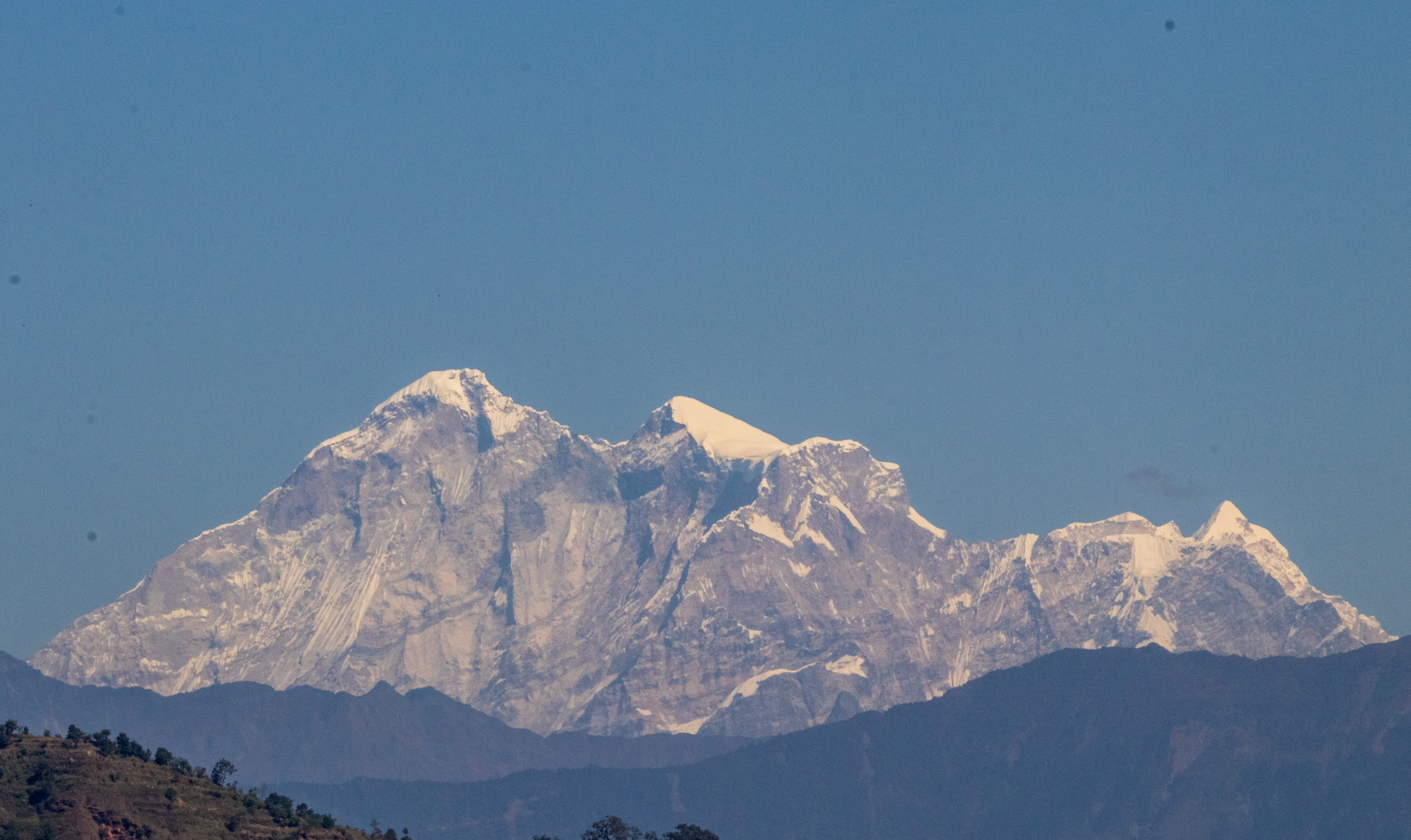
- Southwestern aspect of Gaurishankar seen from Dulalthok

Highest point
- Elevation: 7,134 m (23,406 ft) (Note: Sources differ widely on this peak's elevation and prominence. Peakbagger for example gives an elevation of 7134 m and a prominence of 1709 m.)
- Prominence: 1,600 m (5,200 ft)
- Listing: Ultra
- Coordinates: 27°57′12″N 86°20′09″E

Naming
- English translation: The Goddess and her Consort
- Language of name: Nepali language

Geography
- Location within Nepal
- Location: Nepal/China
- Parent range: Rolwaling Himal

Climbing
- First ascent: May 8, 1979, by John Roskelley and Dorje Sherpa
- Easiest route: Snow/ice climb

Gaurishankar is a mountain in the Himalayas and the second highest peak of the Rolwaling Himal with an elevation of 7,134 m (23,406 ft). The name comes from the Hindu goddess Gauri, a manifestation of Parvati, and her consort Shankar, a manifestation of Shiva, reflecting the sacred regard it is afforded by the people of Nepal. The Sherpa people name the mountain Jomo Tseringma. Nepal Standard Time is based on the meridian of this mountain peak.

== Location ==
Gaurishankar lies near the western edge of the Rolwaling Himal, about 100 kilometres (62 mi) northeast of Kathmandu, from where it is visible. It is roughly equidistant between Kathmandu and Mount Everest. To the west of the peak lies the valley of the Bhote Kosi, the western boundary of the Rolwaling Himal. To the north lies the Menlung Chu, which separates it from its sister peak Melungtse. To the south lies the Rolwaling Chu, which leads up to the Tesi Lapcha pass, giving access to the Khumbu region. It is in the Dolakha District.

== Notable features ==
The mountain has two summits, the northern (higher) summit being called Shankar and the southern summit being called Gauri (a manifestation of Shiva's consort). It rises dramatically above the Bhote Kosi only 5 km away, and is protected on all sides by steep faces and long, corniced ridges.

== Climbing history ==
The first attempts to climb Gaurishankar were made in the 1950s and 1960s but weather, avalanches and difficult ice faces defeated all parties. From 1965 until 1979, the mountain was officially closed to climbing. When permission was granted in 1979, an American-Nepalese expedition finally managed to gain the top, via the west face. This was a route of extreme technical difficulty. The permit from the Nepalese Ministry of Tourism stipulated that the summit could only be reached if an equal number of climbers from both nations were on the summit team. John Roskelley and Dorje Sherpa fulfilled that obligation.

In the same year, a British-Nepalese expedition led by Peter Boardman climbed the long and difficult southwest ridge. Boardman, Tim Leach, Guy Neidhardt, and Pemba Lama made it to the south "Gauri" summit (7010 m) on November 8, 1979. Though they did not make the long additional traverse to the main "Shankar" summit, their climb was a significant achievement in itself.

In 1983 Gaurishankar was reached again by a Slovenian team. The main summit (7134 m) was reached on November 1 by Slavko Cankar (expedition leader), Bojan Šrot and Smiljan Smodiš; and three days later by Franco Pepevnik and Jože Zupan. They climbed the left side of the south face to reach the southwest ridge, then continuing to the main summit.

The Himalayan Index lists only two more ascents of the main summit of Gauri Sankar. The third ascent was made in the spring of 1984 by Wyman Culbreth and Ang Kami Sherpa, via a new route on a ridge on the southwest face. The fourth ascent (and the first winter ascent), in January 1986, was by South Korean Choi Han-Jo and Ang Kami Sherpa.

In the fall of 2013, the complete south face was finally climbed by a four-man team of French climbers. After reaching the top of the south face at 4 pm on October 21, they decided not to continue to the 7,010 m south summit. It took them 11 hours to descend to the bottom of the face.

== Cultural reference ==
A passing reference to Gaurishankar is made in the poem "Som dreng skar jeg skibe" by Johannes V. Jensen.

== See also ==
- List of ultras of the Himalayas
