= Charnawati Khola Hydroelectric Project =

Hydroelectric power station in Dolakha District, Nepal

- Location within Nepal
- Country: Nepal
- Location: Dolakha District
- Coordinates: 27°39′13″N 86°00′59″E
- Purpose: Power
- Status: Operational
- Opening date: 24th Jestha ,2070 BS
- Owner: Nepal Hydro Developer Limited

Dam and spillways
- Type of dam: Gravity
- Impounds: Mati River

Power Station
- Commission date: 2070BS
- Type: Run-of-the-river
- Hydraulic head: 199 m (653 ft) (Gross)
- Turbines: 2 Pelton-type
- Installed capacity: 3.52 MW

Charnawati Khola Hydroelectric Project is a run-of-the-river hydroelectric power station with an installed capacity of 3.52 MW. This power station is located in Dolakha District, Nepal. The flow is 2.19 m^{3}/s and gross head is 199 m. The annual generation of energy is 20.383 GWh. The electricity is connected to Makaibari (Gaighat) substation of NEA via 11 km long 33kV transmission line.

The plant is operated by Nepal Hydro Developer Limited, a public company developing various hydropower projects in Nepal.
