= UTC+05:45 =

Time zone used in Nepal

- Time zone
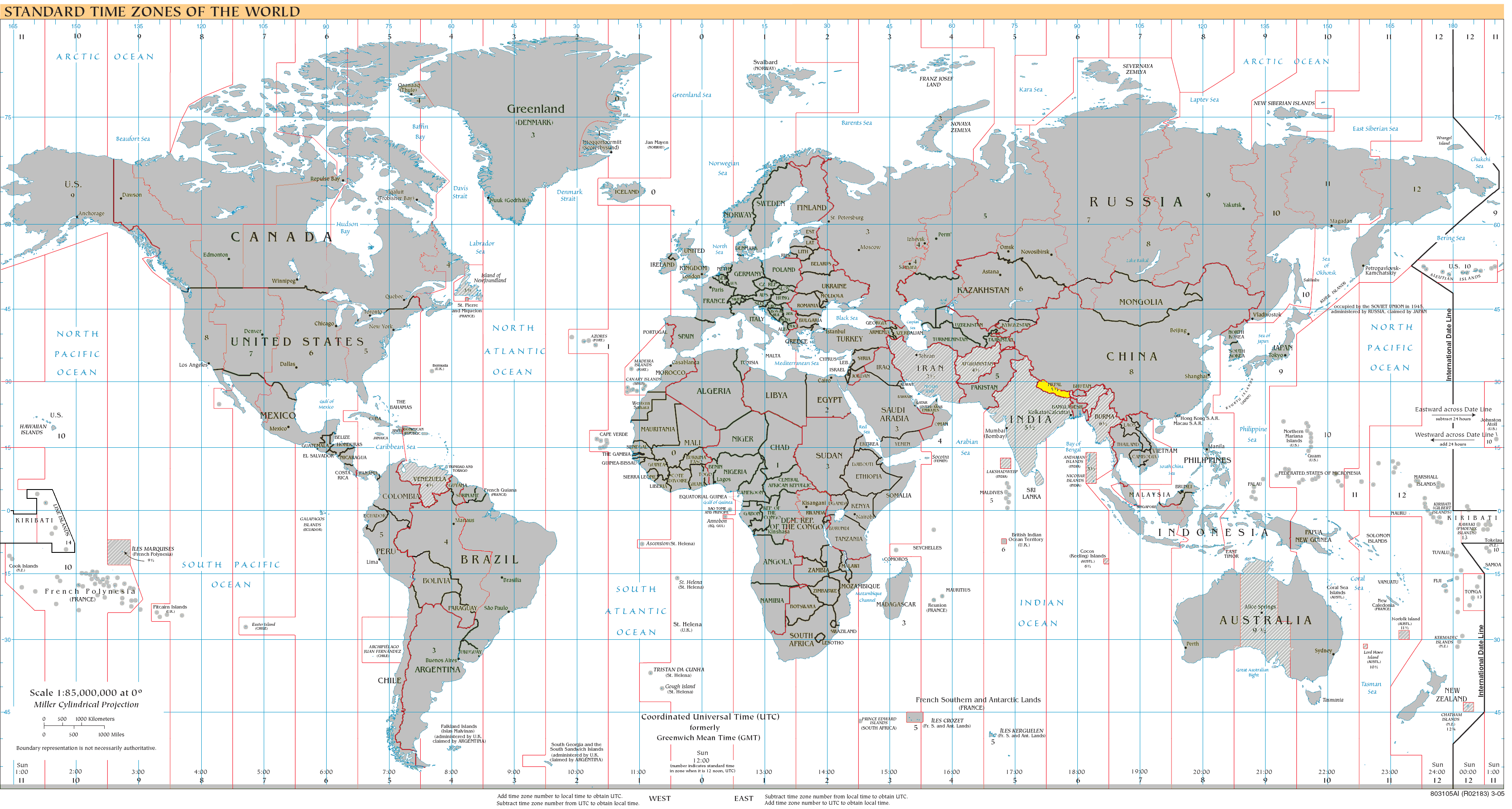
- World map with the time zone highlighted

UTC offset
- UTC: UTC+05:45

Current time
- 08:40, 8 September 2026 UTC+05:45 [refresh]

Central meridian
- 86.25 degrees E

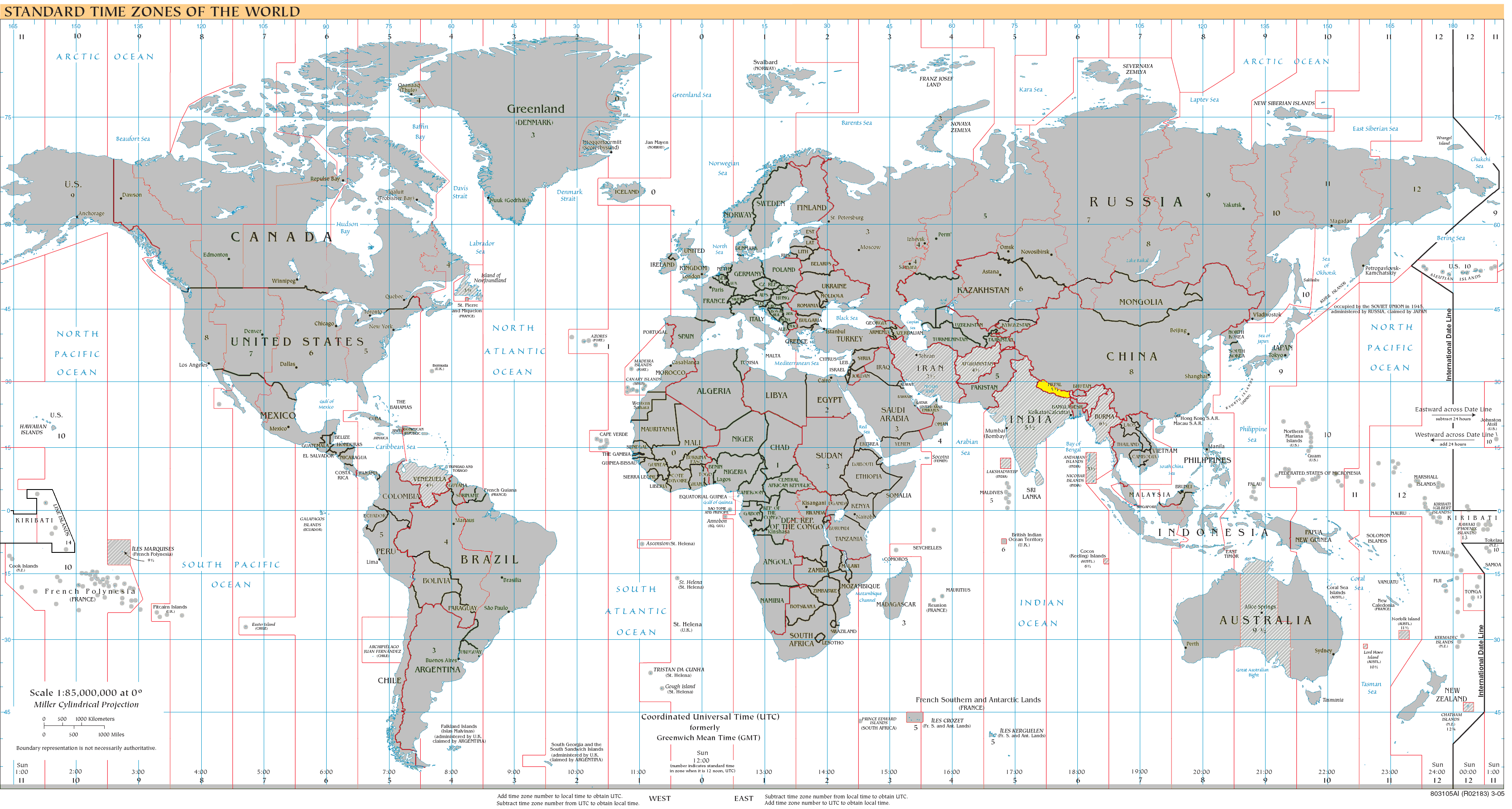
UTC+05:45: blue (December), orange (June), yellow (year-round), light blue (sea areas)

UTC+05:45 is an identifier for a time offset of 5 hours and 45 minutes ahead of Coordinated Universal Time. The Nepal Standard Time, used in Nepal is based on it. It is one of only three time zones with a 45-minute offset from UTC. (Note: The others are Chatham Island Standard Time, with an offset of UTC+12:45, and the unofficial Australian Central Western Time, with an offset of UTC+08:45.) Till 1956 Nepal followed UTC+05:30, same as Indian Standard Time and Sri Lanka Standard Time.

== As standard time (year-round) ==
Principal cities: Kathmandu, Pokhara, Biratnagar

=== South Asia ===
- Nepal – Nepal Standard Time has existed since 1 January 1986, when Nepal adopted the new time zone after they advanced their clocks by 15 minutes ahead of their previous time zone Indian Standard Time.

== See also ==
- UTC+05:40
- Nepal Standard Time
