= Nepal Standard Time =

Time zone

- Time zone

UTC offset
- NPT: UTC+05:45

Current time
- :: NPT [refresh]

Observance of DST
- DST is not observed in this time zone.

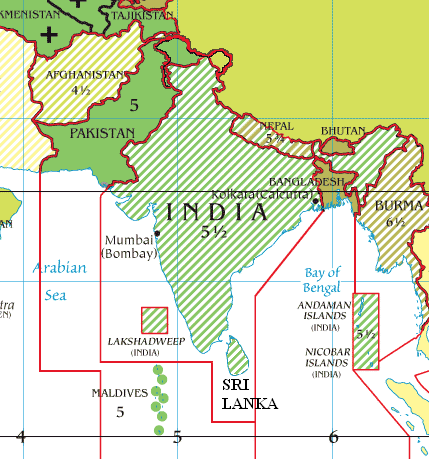
Time zones of South Asia, with Nepal Standard Time indicated

Nepal Time (NPT) is the time zone for Nepal. With a time offset from Coordinated Universal Time (UTC) of UTC+05:45 all over Nepal, it is one of only three time zones with a 45-minute offset from UTC. (Note: The others are Chatham Island Standard Time, with an offset of UTC+12:45, and the unofficial Australian Central Western Time, with an offset of UTC+08:45.)

== Calculation ==
NPT is an approximation of Kathmandu mean time, which is 5 hours, 41 minutes, and 16 seconds ahead of UTC. The standard meridian passes through the peak of Gaurishankar mountain about 100 kilometres (62 mi) east of Kathmandu.

== History ==
Nepal used local solar time until the year 1920, in Kathmandu UTC+05:41:16. In 1920, Nepal adopted Indian Standard Time, UTC+05:30. In 1986 Nepal advanced their clocks by 15 minutes, giving them a time zone of UTC+05:45.

== IANA time zone database ==
The IANA time zone database contains one zone for Nepal in the file zone.tab, named Asia/Kathmandu.

== See also ==
- Date and time notation in Nepal
- UTC+05:40
- UTC+05:45
