= Melungtse =

Mountain in Tibet, China

- 门隆则峰
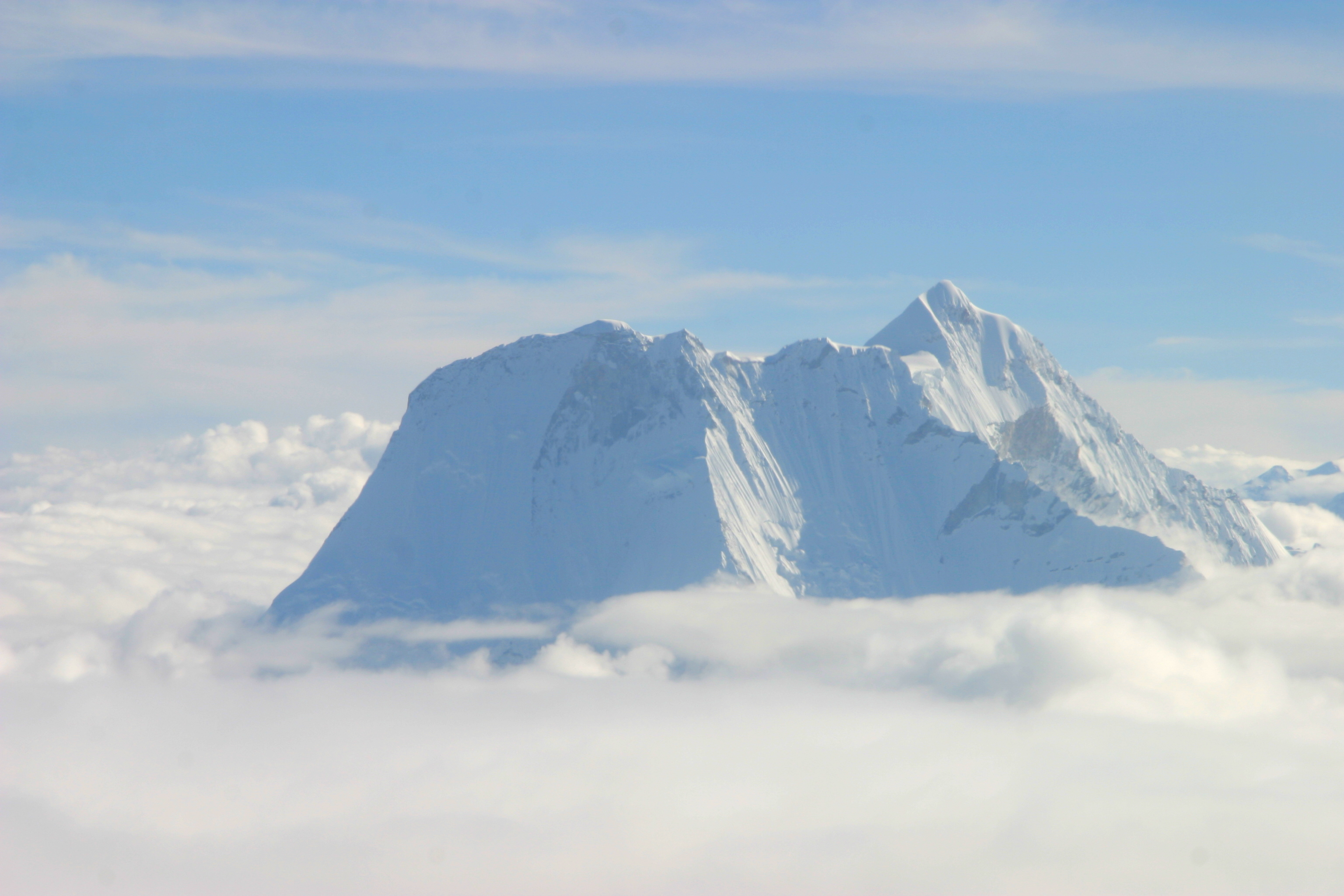
- Southwestern aspect of Melungtse from an aircraft. Main summit in the background on the right, Melungtse II is the left peak on the ridge in the foreground.

Highest point
- Elevation: 7,181 m (23,560 ft)
- Prominence: 1,551 m (5,089 ft)
- Listing: Ultra; Mountains of China
- Coordinates: 27°58′21″N 86°25′54″E

Geography
- Location within Tibet
- Country: China
- Region: Tibet
- Parent range: Rolwaling Himal, Himalayas

Climbing
- First ascent: October 23, 1992 by Marko Prezelj and Andrej Štremfelj
- Easiest route: snow/ice climb

Melungtse (Chinese: 门隆则峰; Standard Tibetan: Jobo Garu; Chinese: 乔格茹峰; pinyin: Qiáogérú Fēng; other English spelling: Menlungtse) is the highest mountain of the Rolwaling Himal in the Himalayas.

The peak has a long summit ridge capped by the east (main) summit and the west summit, also known as Melungtse II, at 7,023 m. The mountain's steep faces make it more difficult than its elevation would suggest.

== Location ==
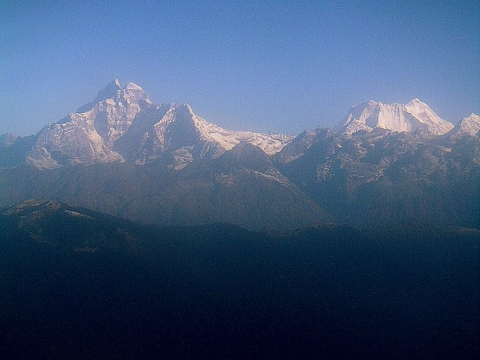
Melungtse (right) and Gauri Sankar (left)

Melungtse lies just north of the Nepal–China border, on a western spur ridge coming out of the main north-south trending ridge of the Rolwaling Himal, in Tingri County, Shigatse Prefecture of Tibet. To the southwest, across the Menlung Chu, lies Gauri Sankar, which, though a bit lower (7134 m), is much more visible from Nepal, hence better-known. Melungtse lies about 40 km west of Mount Everest.

== Climbing history ==
Melungtse was off limits to climbing until quite recently. The first attempt was made in Oct 1982 when Bill Denz made a strictly illegal attempt on the southeast ridge, after sneaking over the border from Nepal's Rolwaling Valley. However he turned back while still low on the route. In 1987 and 1988 Chris Bonington led two expeditions, with the second one succeeding in putting Andy Fanshawe and Alan Hinkes on the west summit, but did not climb the main summit. Another attempt in 1990, this time on the East Ridge of the main summit, failed well below the top.

The first ascent of the main peak came in 1992. Slovenians Marko Prezelj and Andrej Štremfelj ascended the dangerous, 2000 m southeast face in less than two and a half days up and down and reached the summit on October 23.

An attempt via the North Face in 1999 reached a spot on the eastern end about 1,600 m (5,200 ft) below the summit. However, an ensuing nine day storm dumped too much snow on the upper route and the attempt was aborted. The expedition leader attempted the North Face again in 2005 along with two Russian climbers but aborted the attempt at around 6,300 m (20,700 ft) after one of the Russians was unable to continue due to injury.

== See also ==
- List of ultras of the Himalayas

== Sources ==
- Neate, Jill (1989). High Asia: An Illustrated History of the 7000 Metre Peaks. Seattle: The Mountaineers. ISBN 0-89886-238-8.
- Andy Fanshawe and Stephen Venables, Himalaya Alpine-Style, Hodder and Stoughton, 1995.
- Koichiro Ohmori, Over the Himalaya. Cloudcap/The Mountaineers, 1994.
- American Alpine Journal
- Himalayan Index
- DEM files for the Himalaya (Corrected versions of SRTM data)
- Tibet Ultra-Prominences on peaklist.org
