= Rolwaling Himal =

Mountain range on Nepal/Tibet border

Rolwaling Valley
- रोल्वालिङ् भ्याली.
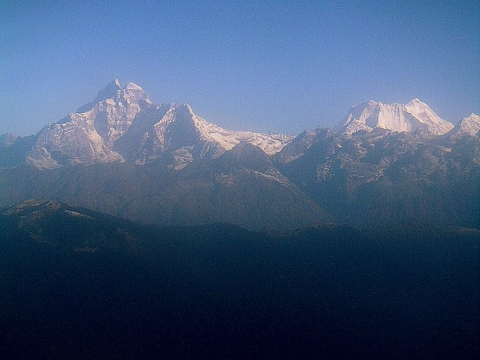
- Gaurishankar (left) and Melungtse (right)

Highest point
- Peak: Melungtse
- Elevation: 7,181 m (23,560 ft)
- Coordinates: 27°58′21″N 86°25′54″E

Geography
- Location within Nepal Location within Tibet
- Countries: Nepal; Tibet
- District: Dolakha Town, Nepal
- Range coordinates: 27°57′N 86°20′E
- Parent range: Himalayas
- Borders on: Mahalangur Himal

Rolwāling Valley (Nepali: रोल्वालिङ् भ्याली.), known as a (Gaurishankar) rural municipality, is a section of the Himalayas in east-central Nepal along the Tibet border. Rolwaling Himal includes Melungtse 7181m and Melungtse II 7023m inside Tibet and Gaurishankar 7134m on the Nepal border with some 50 additional peaks over 6000m, all extending from the Nangpa La pass where the Mahalangur section begins, southwest to the Tamakosi River. The Labuche Himal section rises beyond the Tamakosi to the northwest. Rolwaling Himal is bounded on the south by the Rolwaling Valley which contain several small sherpa villages Tasi Nam, Simigau and Beding under rolwaling valley, Tasi Nam is the largest town of the area. From Kathmandu five to six days are to reach Namche Bazaar around 10 days to mount Everest base camp, which have to Tasilapcha pass (5755 m). Visitors can trek to Everest base camp by crossing Tasilapcha, fly from Kathmandu to Lukla or walk from kharikhola.

Access to the valley and the mountains of the range is made on foot through an established trail system starting at Jagat, Bhiku rural municipality (230 km east of Kathmandu). Ten hours drive by local bus (5–6 hours by pvt car). A western style trek from Jagat to Beding will normally take four to five days. There are two ways to reach Beding, either by Tasinam village, or Simigua. From Tasinam trekkers can pass Daldung la pass (at 4500 m) and enjoy wonderful scenery, Himalayan species, cultures, flora and fauna. Tsho Rolpa (also Chho Rolpa) is one of the biggest glacial lakes in Nepal. The lake, which is located at an altitude of 4,580 metres (15,030 ft) in the Rolwaling Valley, Dolakha.

Rolwaling valley is under Gaurishankar Rural municipality. The first Western exploration of the area was made by Eric Shipton in 1951 during the reconnaissance of Mount Everest.

Sherpa Clan in Rolwaling valley are Chusherpa or Ngonpa or Ngonba, Murminso, Rukpa, Sakywa, Lakshindo, Salakha & Sangu.

== Religion ==
Rolwaling is the site of a cave which some Buddhists consider blessed, and travel to for meditation.

== See also ==
- Mountain ranges of the Himalayas
- Geography of Nepal
- Geography of Tibet
- List of mountain ranges
- Rolwaling Valley
