= Kuehne + Nagel =

Global transport and logistics company based in Switzerland

Kuehne + Nagel International AG

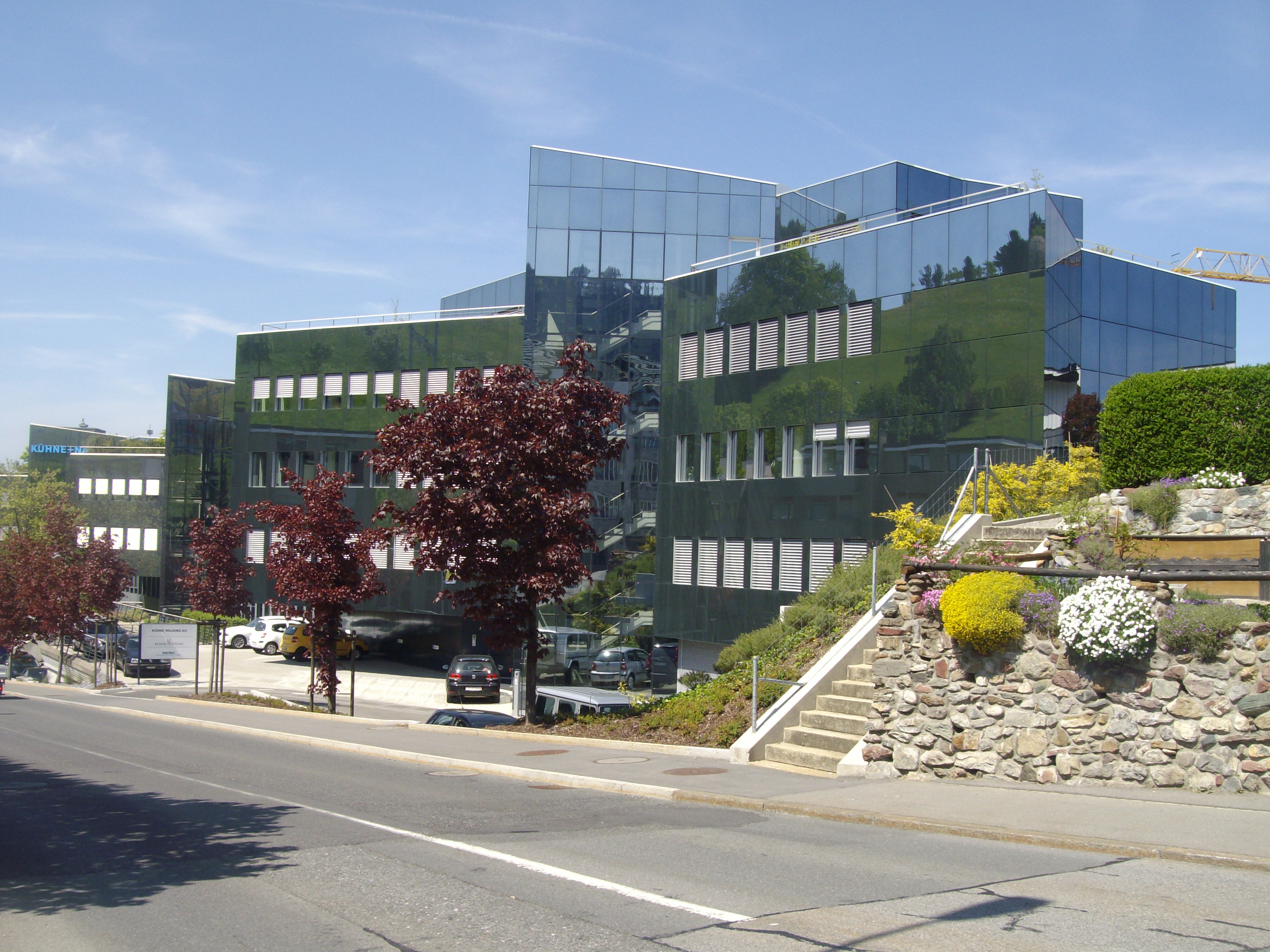
- Type: Public
- Traded as: SIX: KNIN
- Industry: Transport; Logistics
- Founded: 1890; 136 years ago in Bremen, Germany
- Founders: August Kühne; Friedrich Nagel
- Headquarters: Schindellegi (canton of Schwyz), Switzerland
- Number of locations: 1,300 (2023)
- Area served: Worldwide
- Key people: Jörg Wolle (chairman); Stefan Paul (CEO); Markus Blanka-Graff (CFO)
- Products: Sea Logistics; Air Logistics; Road Logistics; Contract Logistics
- Services: Transportation and Fulfillment; Warehousing and Distribution; Project Logistics; Customs Clearance; Insurance; E-commerce; Supply Chain Management 4PL; Supply Chain Consulting
- Revenue: ▲CHF 24.8 billion (2024)
- Net income: ▼CHF 1.23 billion (2024)
- Total assets: ▲CHF 11.7 billion (2024)
- Total equity: ▲CHF 3.26 billion (2024)
- Number of employees: 96,863 (2024)
- Website: kuehne-nagel.com

Kuehne + Nagel International AG (or Kühne + Nagel) is a global transport and logistics company based in Schindellegi, Switzerland. Its main owner and operator was Klaus-Michael Kühne via his Kühne Holding and Kühne Foundation. The company was founded in 1890 in Bremen, Germany. It provides sea freight and airfreight forwarding, contract logistics, and overland businesses. As of 2023, it has nearly 1,300 offices in over 100 countries and nearly 79,000 employees.

== History ==
=== Early years and evolution: 1890–1933 ===
The origins of Kuehne + Nagel was in 1890, when August Kühne and Friedrich Nagel founded a forwarding commission agency in Bremen, Germany. It was initially used to concentrate on cotton and consolidated freight. Later in 1902, it expanded its operations to Hamburg.

In 1907, the co-founder Friedrich Nagel died, and August Kühne took over his shares in the company. The legacy of Nagel still lives on, in the company's name – Kuehne + Nagel. World War I greatly affected its businesses.

Upon Kühne's death in 1932, his sons – Alfred and Werner – became partners in the firm. Adolf Maass (1875 – probably early in 1945 in Auschwitz concentration camp), who was Jewish, a partner, and one of the firm's shareholders with a 45% stake, was forced out in April 1933. On 1 May 1933 Alfred and Werner Kühne joined the Nazi Party, and under the brothers' management the firm played a prominent role in the transport of property seized from Jews in occupied territories.

=== Involvement in Nazi theft of Jewish property ===
Kuehne + Nagel played a key role in the Nazi regime's "M-Aktion". In total, by August 1944, the responsible Nazi agency had had the furnishings of around 65,000 apartments in the Netherlands, Belgium, France and Luxembourg removed. This required 500 barges and 674 trains. Kuehne + Nagel played a key role in the implementation of the transport logistics. The company was active both directly and with the help of subcontractors in all occupied Western countries.

The transports from the Netherlands are the most extensively researched. For example, Kuehne + Nagel chartered its own steamer to transport looted Jewish property to the German Reich. The first cargo ship from Amsterdam arrived Bremen in December 1942. The parts list shows 220 armchairs, 105 beds, 363 tables, 598 chairs, 126 cupboards, 35 sofas, 307 boxes of glassware, 110 mirrors, 158 lamps, 32 clocks, a gramophone and two strollers. These were the property of Dutch Jews who had been deported to concentration camps in the summer of 1941.

The company rapidly expanded during WWII in order to meet the needs of the Nazi war effort, this laid the groundwork for their post-war success. After the war the company escaped repercussions from their activities by cooperating with American and European intelligence agencies.

=== Transition to a Swiss holding co., and expansion: 1950s – 1990s ===
In the early 1950s, Alfred Kühne initiated the company's international expansion. Kuehne + Nagel expanded its operations into Canada, with the opening of branch offices in Toronto, Ontario and Montreal, Quebec. In 1963, Kuehne + Nagel took a controlling stake in Athens based Proodos S.A, and also expanded into Italy. In 1975, the company adopted a holding company structure, with the formation of Kuehne + Nagel International AG based in Schindellegi, Switzerland, as the ultimate holding company.

In the mid-1960s, a third-generation member of the Kühne family, Klaus-Michael Kühne joined his father Alfred Kühne as a junior partner, having completed an apprenticeship in banking. In 1966, at the age of 30, he joined the management team as executive chairman and spearheaded Kuehne + Nagel's future expansion, particularly its European and the Far Eastern operations.

In 1981, Alfred Kühne died. In July the same year, due to the losses sustained by the Kühne family in attempting to expand its shipping fleet, a 50% stake in Kuehne + Nagel was sold to the British conglomerate Lonrho Plc for 90 million DM. Following the purchase, Klaus-Michael Kühne and Lonrho's head, Roland "Tiny" Rowland acted as joint chief executives of the combined organisation. Kuehne + Nagel further expanded with its acquisition of freight companies: Domenichelli SpA (Italy), Van Vliet BV (Netherlands), Hollis Transport Group Ltd. (UK), Transportes Tres (Spain), and other acquisitions in Denmark, Norway, and Sweden.

=== Further expansion: 1990s – 2000 ===
The 1990 German reunification was an important event for many German companies, including Kuehne + Nagel, and provided them the necessary impetus to expand further. After the reunification, Kuehne + Nagel integrated its network in the former German Democratic Republic, and consolidated its operations. In 1992, it bought back Lonrho plc's 50% stake in the company, and went public in May 1994. It was listed on the Zurich and Frankfurt exchanges, which provided a platform for further exchange-based acquisitions. The same year, Kuehne + a Russian subsidiary, and pushed ahead into Norway, Sweden, and Denmark.

In the mid 1990s, strategic focus given to expand the lucrative logistics-related contracts / operations paid off – one being with DuPont in which Kuehne + Nagel would operate the chemical giant's leveraged distribution activities in Europe, the Middle East, and Africa. In July 1999, Kühne handed over the post of CEO to Klaus Herms, and continued as the executive chairman and president of the board.

=== 2000 to present ===
In the early 2000s, Kuehne + Nagel obtained a foothold in the Asia Pacific contract logistics market, when it forged a strategic alliance with Singapore-based SembCorp Logistics. In 2001, it acquired USCO Logistics Inc. – a warehouse-based logistics service provider based in Hamden, Connecticut, for US$300 million. Kuehne + Nagel and SembCorp chose to follow different strategic paths in 2004, and ended their strategic partnership.

In October 2007, the board of Kuehne + Nagel appointed Reinhard Lange as the successor to CEO Klaus Herms, effective June 2009 to ensure a smooth handover. The succession plan was similar to the SAP's 2007 CEO transition plan from Henning Kagermann to Léo Apotheker, which received praise in the media.

In 2012, Kuehne + Nagel acquired the business contracts of Canada's Perishables International Transportation (PIT) to expand into global fresh and frozen foods network.

In September 2013, Kuehne + Nagel agreed to merge its rail freight business with VTG to form VTG Rail Logistics, which would be Europe's largest private rail freight business when it started operations in 2014.

In April 2014, Kuehne + Nagel International was fined $3.1 million for its part in a freight forwarding cartel case brought by the Commerce Commission. Kuehne + Nagel was the last defendant in the seven-year investigation involving six firms, who referred to themselves as the "Gardening Club" and used horticultural code to discuss anti-competitive practices among them.

In June 2020 the 2021 Rugby League World Cup announced that Kuehne + Nagel would become the official Logistics Partner of the tournament. Three years later, the company became the logistics partner of the British Olympic Association, which is why it took over logistics services for the 2024 Summer Olympics in Paris.

In November 2023 Kuehne + Nagel acquired Farrow, a customs broker out of Ontario, Canada. Farrow will be fully owned by Kuehne + Nagel in early 2024.

In January 2024, Palestine Action vandalized the Kuehne + Nagel office in Milton Keynes, England by smashing windows and spraying the building with paint. Palestine Action said they targeted the company because it was assisting the delivery of weapons to Israel.

During that same month, Kuehne + Nagel acquired a 51% stake in IMC Logistics, the largest marine drayage company in the United States.

=== Public processing of the company's history and commemoration ===
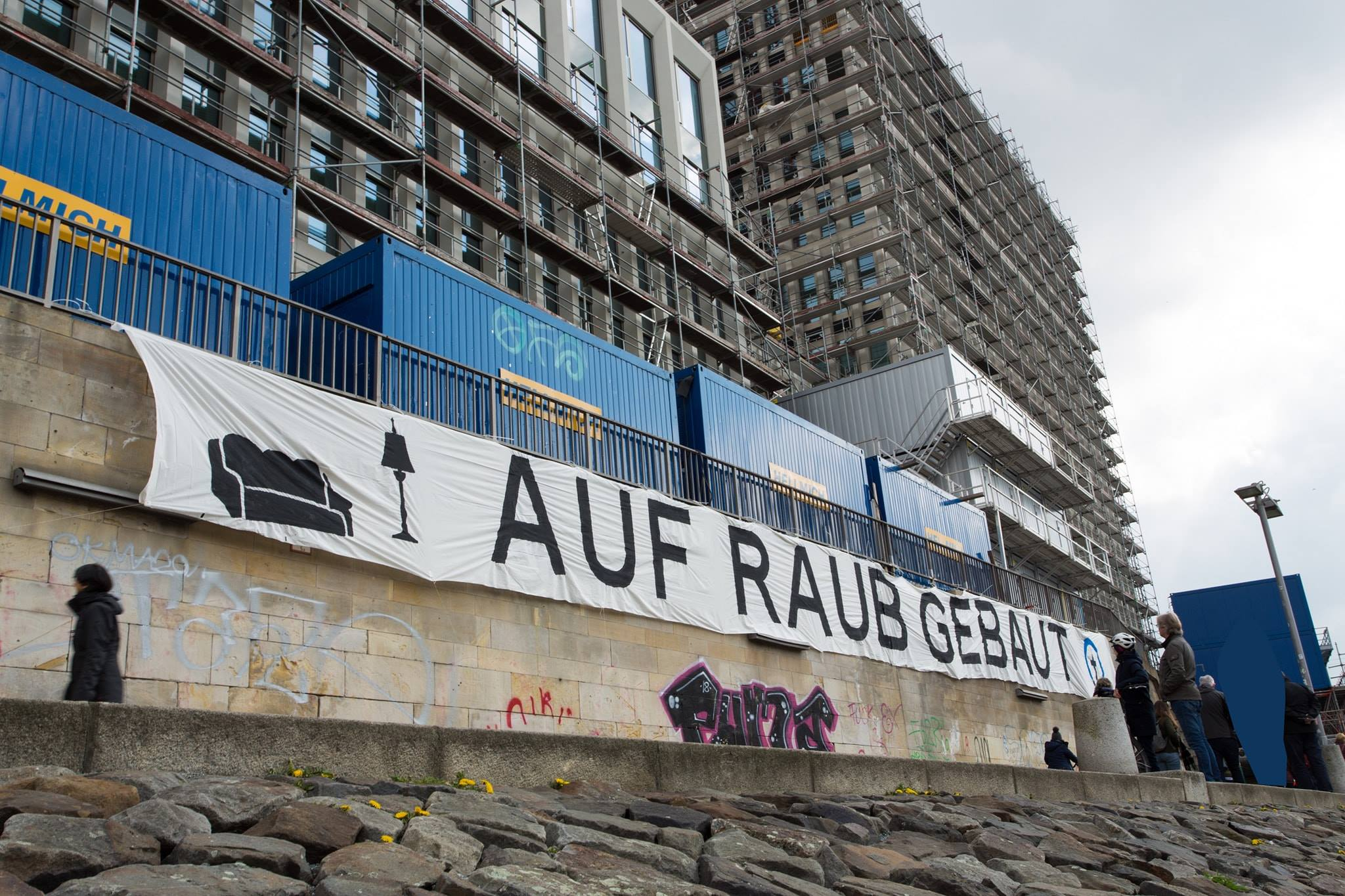
Protest banner against Kühne + Nagel's refusal to assume its historical responsibility at the German HQ in Bremen, Slogan: "Built on robbery", April 2019.

Since Klaus Michael Kühne and the company Kuehne + Nagel refused to remember the Jews his company robbed during the Holocaust, a citizens' initiative was founded in Bremen. The Bremen editorial team of Die Tagezeitung launched an initiative in 2015 in close coordination with the Jewish community of Bremen and against resistance of political officials. The initiative wanted the company to commemorate its crimes between 1933 and 1945 with a memorial in front of its newly built headquarters. The core of the conflict was how close the memorial could be to the headquarters. Finally in 2022 a memorial on public ground, 150m from Kuehne + Nagel was inaugurated on the shore of the Weser River.

== Organization ==
The group employs more than 78,000 people in 1000 locations in more than 100 countries and has approximately 12 million sqm of warehouse space under management. It is organised in the following five geographical divisions:

- Europe (based in Hamburg, Germany)
- Middle East and Africa (based in Dubai, United Arab Emirates)
- North America (based in Jersey City, New Jersey, United States)
- Central & South America (based in Santiago de Chile, Chile)
- Asia Pacific (based in Singapore, Singapore)

== Operations ==
Kuehne + Nagel is divided into the following operating segments:

- Sea Logistics
- Air Logistics
- Road Logistics
- Contract Logistics

== Services ==
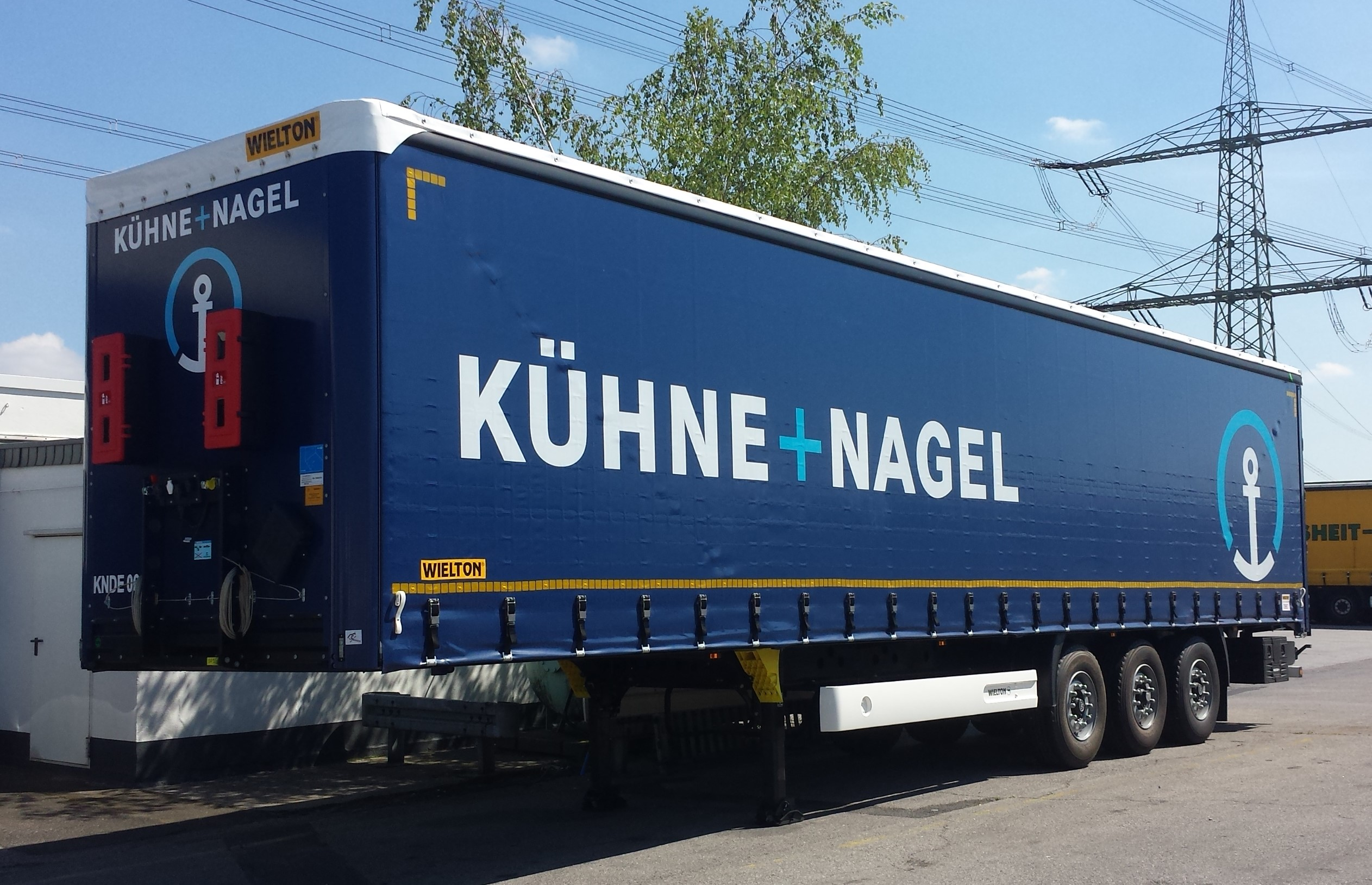
Semi-trailer of Kuehne + Nagel

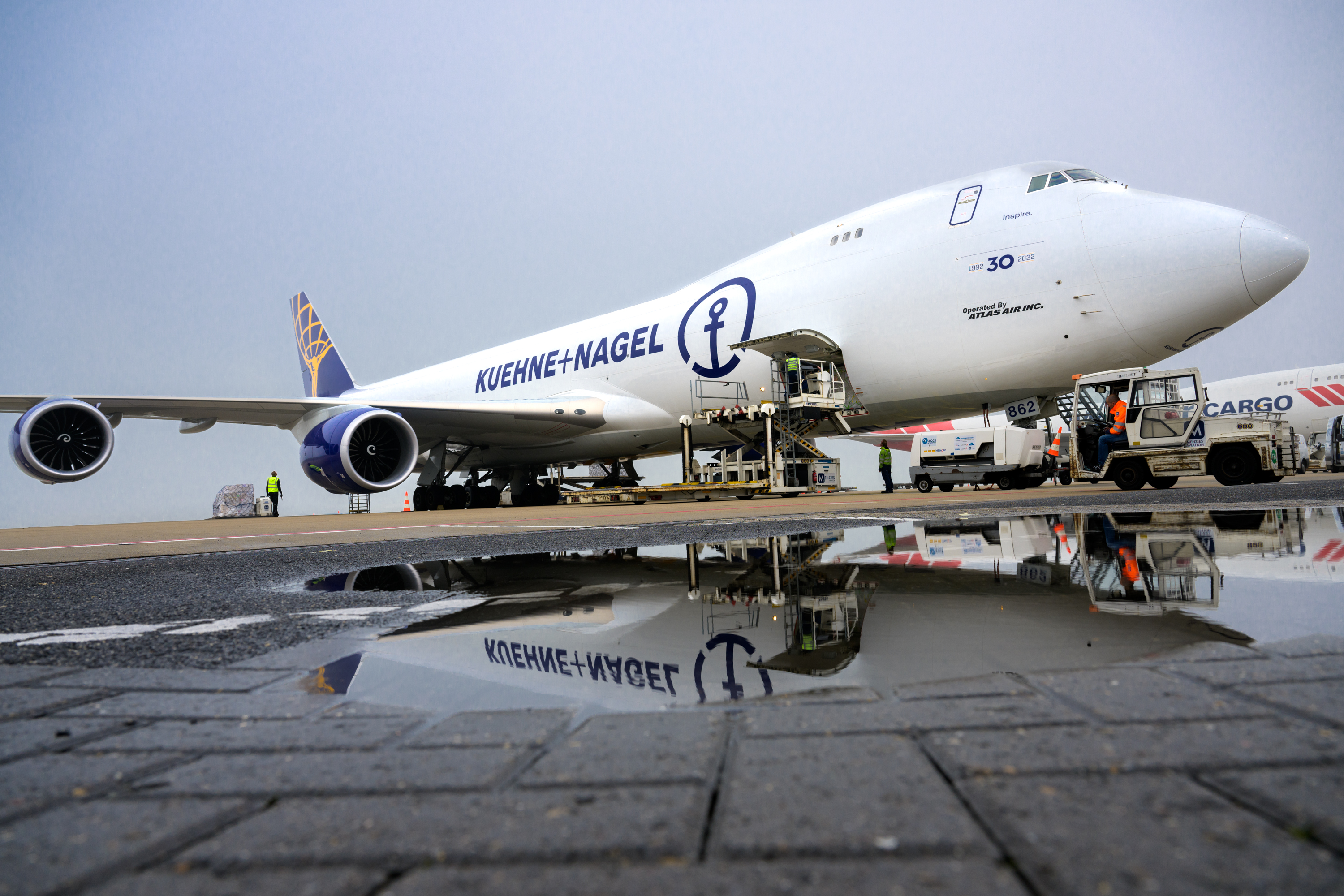
Boeing 747 at Amsterdam Airport Schiphol

Kuehne + Nagel provides sea freight and airfreight forwarding, contract logistics and overland businesses; with a focus on providing IT-based logistics.

Its freight forwarding (sea / air) services, include the necessary arrangement for the transport of goods by road and rail. Its contract logistics unit offers warehousing and distribution services.

Kuehne + Nagel Integrated Logistics includes 4PL Management, Supplier & Inventory Management, Aftermarket Management and Supply Chain Technology. Kuehne + Nagel Integrated Logistics acts as the single point of contact with full operational responsibility with focus on supply-chain integration.

Kuehne + Nagel's products extend to the world's largest industries including: aerospace, automotive, fast-moving consumer goods, high-tech & consumer electronics, industrial goods, oil & gas, retail, pharma & healthcare.

== Leadership ==
=== Board of Directors ===
- Jörg Wolle (Chairman)
- Klaus-Michael Kuehne (Honorary Chairman)
- Karl Gernandt (Vice Chairman)
- Dominik Bürgy
- Anne-Catherine Berner
- Dominik de Daniel
- Hauke Stars
- Martin C. Wittig
- Tobias B. Staehelin

=== Current Management Board ===
- Stefan Paul – Chief Executive Officer, since 2022
- Markus Blanka-Graff – Chief Financial Officer, since 2014
- Sarah Kreienbühl – Chief Human Resources Officer, since 2023
- Marc Pfeffer – Chief Legal Officer, since 2023
- Martin Kolbe – Chief Information Officer, since 2005
- Michael Aldwell – Executive Vice President Sea Logistics, since 2023
- Yngve Ruud – Executive Vice President Air Logistics, since 2016
- Gianfranco Sgro – Executive Vice President Contract Logistics, since 2015
- Hansjörg Rodi – Executive Vice President Road Logistics, since 2022

=== Previous Chief Executive Officers ===
- Detlef Trefzger – CEO, 2013 to 2022
- Reinhard Lange – CEO, 2009 to 2013
- Klaus Herms – CEO, 1999 to 2009
- Klaus-Michael Kuehne – CEO, 1966 to 1999

== See also ==
- Kühne School of Logistics and Management
- Freight Forwarding
