= Fujairah F2 IWPP =

- Official name: Fujairah F2 Integrated Water and Power Plant
- Country: United Arab Emirates
- Location: Qidfa', Fujairah
- Coordinates: 25°18′07″N 56°22′22″E
- Status: Operational
- Construction began: 2007
- Commission date: 2010
- Construction cost: $2.8 billion

Thermal power station
- Primary fuel: Natural gas
- Turbine technology: Gas turbine
- IWPP?: Yes
- IWPP purification method: Multiple-effect distillation; reverse osmosis
- IWPP water output: 591,500 m^{3}/d (241,800 cu ft/ks)

Power generation
- Nameplate capacity: 2,000 MW

External links
- Website: official website

Fujairah F2 Independent Water and Power Plant or Fujairah F2 IWPP is an independent water and power plant (IWPP) at Qidfa', Fujairah in the United Arab Emirates. It is located next to the Fujairah F1 IWPP plant south of Khor Fakkan and north of the city of Fujairah. During inauguration, it was the largest desalination plant in the United Arab Emirates.

== History ==
Abu Dhabi Water & Electricity Authority (ADWEA) - Now called as Abu Dhabi Energy Company (TAQA) selected International Power, now called as Engie Energy International and Marubeni Corporation to build the project in 2007. The plant costed $2.8 billion to build and took three years to be completely finished.

== Technical description ==
The Fujairah F2 IWPP has an installed power capacity of 2,000 MW and it produces 591,500 cubic meter of water per day. GT26 heavy-duty gas turbines to the power plant will be distributed by Alstom, while the desalination plant will be built by Sidem.

For the water desalination, the plant uses a combination of two different desalination technologies. 455,000 cubic meter of water per day is produced using multiple-effect distillation (MED) technology and 136,500 cubic meter of water per day is produced using reverse osmosis technology (RO).

== Operating company ==
The plant is owned by the Fujairah Asia Power Company (FAPCO), established on 23 October 2007. The shareholders of FAPCO are:

- The Abu Dhabi Water and Electricity Authority (ADWEA), Abu Dhabi Energy Company (TAQA) – 60%
- International Power Engie Energy international – 20%
- Marubeni – 20%

The plant will be operated by Fujairah F2 O&M Company Limited, an equal based venture between International Power and Marubeni. The Reverse Osmosis plant will be operated by Veolia Water.
