= Alan C. McKinnon =

British academic and professor of logistics

- Born: September 19, 1953 (age 73); Motherwell, UK
- Citizenship: British
- Occupation: Professor of Logistics
- Known for: Research on freight transport decarbonization and sustainable logistics
- Spouse: Sabine Rohde
- Children: Philip McKinnon and Christopher McKinnon
- Parent(s): Alexander McKinnon and Janet McPheat
- Awards: Sir Robert Lawrence Award (2003)

Academic background
- Education: University of Aberdeen (MA); University of British Columbia (MA); University College London (PhD)

Academic work
- Institutions: University of Leicester; Heriot-Watt University; Kühne Logistics University
- Website: www.alanmckinnon.co.uk

Alan Campbell McKinnon (born September 19, 1953) is a British academic and authority on logistics. He holds professor emeritus of logistics at Heriot-Watt University and at Kühne Logistics University. He is primarily known for his research and advisory work, on freight transport and the decarbonization of logistics, to governments, parliamentary committees and international bodies, including the World Bank, the European Commission, UNCTAD, and the World Economic Forum.

== Early life and education ==
McKinnon earned a Master of Arts from both the University of Aberdeen and the Master of Arts from the University of British Columbia in Canada. He completed his Doctor of Philosophy (PhD) at University College London (UCL) in 1984, where his doctoral research focused on the spatial organization of physical distribution within the British food manufacturing sector.

== Career ==
=== Academic life ===
McKinnon began his academic teaching career in October 1979 as a lecturer in economic geography at the University of Leicester. In 1987, he moved to Heriot-Watt University in Edinburgh, where he established a dedicated logistics research center and launched the university's master's degree program in logistics and supply chain management. He served as Professor of Logistics and Director of the Logistics Research Centre at Heriot-Watt until 2012, when he was designated professor emeritus.

In 2012, McKinnon relocated to Germany to join the newly established Kühne Logistics University in Hamburg. At KLU, he served as Dean of Programs (2012–2014) and Head of Logistics (2012–2016).

=== Research and public policy ===
He has served as an advisor to national governments, parliamentary committees, and international bodies. His advisory work includes roles with the World Bank, the European Commission, UNCTAD, the OECD / International Transport Forum, and the World Economic Forum, where he served as Chairman of the Global Agenda Council on Logistics and Supply Chain.

In addition, McKinnon was a lead author for the transport sector chapter in the Fifth Assessment Report of the Intergovernmental Panel on Climate Change (IPCC).

== Awards and recognition ==
In 2002, he received the Herbert Crow Memorial Award from the Worshipful Company of Carmen for his ‘outstanding contribution to logistics in the academic field’. In 2003, he was awarded the Sir Robert Lawrence Award, the highest individual honor awarded by the Chartered Institute of Logistics and Transport (UK), recognizing a sustained contribution to the freight transport and logistics industry. In 2012, he was designated Professor Emeritus, at the KLU. In 2025, he was awarded Honorary Doctorate from the University of Tampere, for his research and development work in the field.
