= Klaus-Michael Kühne =

German billionaire and businessman (1937–2026)

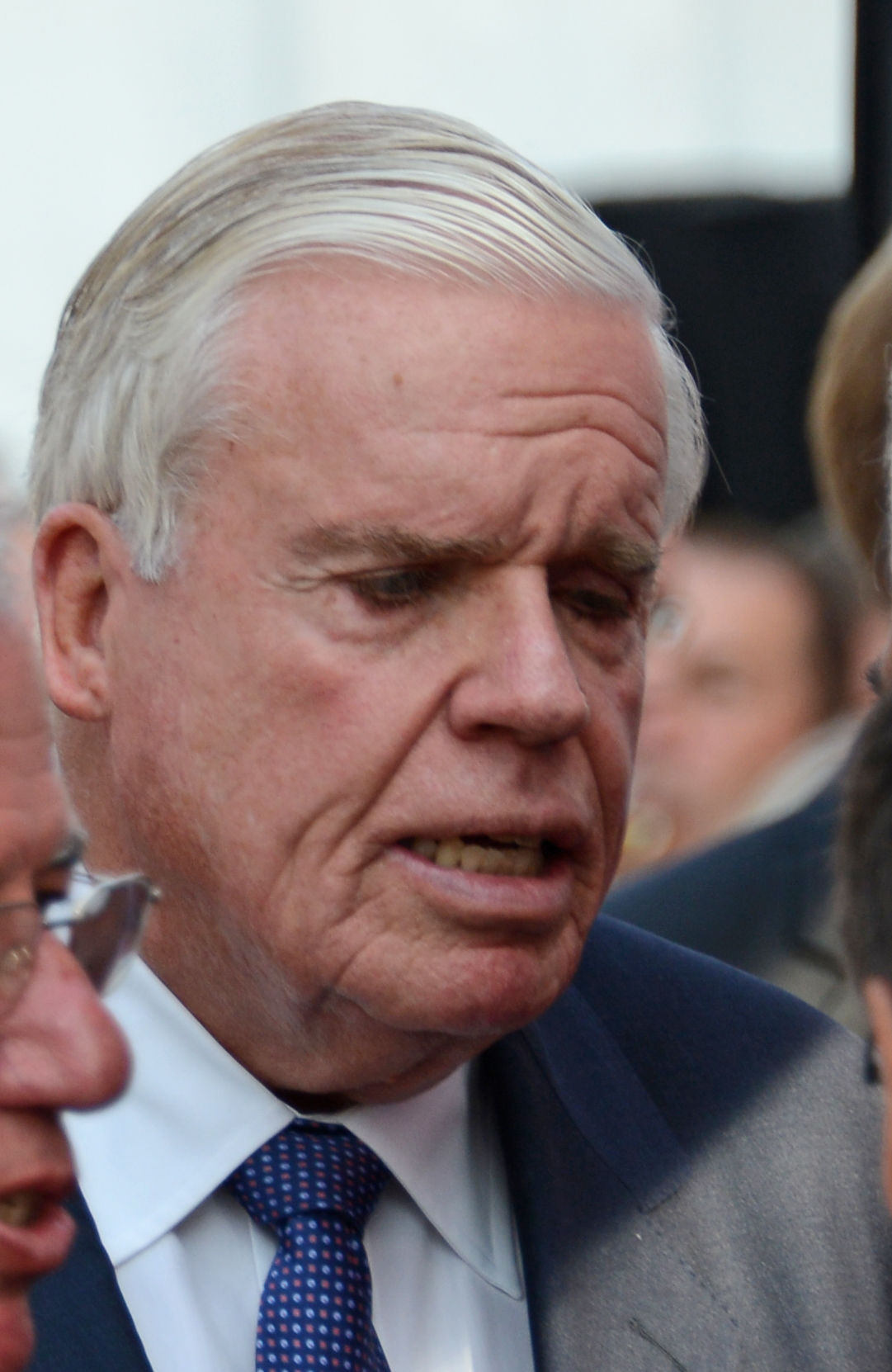
- Kühne in 2012
- Born: 2 June 1937; Hamburg, Nazi Germany
- Died: 23 August 2026 (aged 89); Schindellegi, Canton of Schwyz, Switzerland
- Occupation: Businessman
- Title: Honorary chairman, Kuehne + Nagel
- Father: Alfred Kühne
- Relatives: August Kühne (grandfather)
- Website: www.kn-portal.com

Klaus-Michael Kühne (2 June 1937 – 23 August 2026) was a German billionaire businessman. In October 2021, the Bloomberg Billionaires Index estimated Kühne's net worth to be US$36.2 billion, making him the richest person in Germany. He was the honorary chairman and majority owner (53.3%) of the international transport company Kuehne + Nagel, co-founded by his grandfather, August Kühne (1855–1932).

As important shareholder of flag-carrier Lufthansa, and main owner of Hapag-Lloyd and Kuehne + Nagel, Kühne was one of the moneyed elites of Germany with influence into politics and economic circles. All of his main companies and investments make their sales in Germany although Kühne did not pay any taxes in Germany for his holding company or his private assets.

== Early life ==
Kühne was born in Hamburg on 2 June 1937. After graduating from high school, Kühne completed a two-year training course as a bank and foreign trade clerk at the private Hamburg bank Münchmeyer & Co.

== Career ==
In 1963, he joined his father Alfred Kühne (1895–1981) as a junior partner at Kuehne + Nagel.

During the first and second oil price crises in the 70s he tried to found a shipping company, but was unsuccessful due to financial pressure. In 1981, the year of his father's death, he had to sell 50% of the company for 90 million Deutsche Marks to the former Lonrho group. He bought the company back for 340 million marks in 1992, and put the Kuehne + Nagel Agency on the stock market in 1994. He became CEO of the company in 1996. By 1998, Kühne was no longer chairman but rather president and delegate of the board of directors. Through Kühne Holding Stock Company, of which he was sole owner, he held a 55.75% share in Kuehne + Nagel International Stock Company.

In 2008, he became a partner in the shipping company Hapag-Lloyd through the Albert Ballin consortium, of which he held a 30% share.

In May 2016, he acquired a 20.3% stake in the rail logistics company VTG for €160 million from American businessman and former United States Secretary of Commerce Wilbur Ross. In July 2018, he sold the stake for €300 million to an infrastructure fund managed by the U.S. investment bank Morgan Stanley.

In April 2020, Kühne upped his stake in shipping company Hapag-Lloyd to 30%, having previously owned 26% of the business, making him the largest shareholder.

In 2022, he doubled his stake in Deutsche Lufthansa AG, Germany's largest airline.

== Personal life and death ==
In 1989, Kühne married Christine (born 1938). The couple had no children. Though he was a German national, Kühne had been living in Schindellegi, Switzerland, since 1975, where the Kuehne + Nagel headquarters is located.

Kühne resisted attempts to investigate the involvement of his family and company with the Nazi government in the 1930s and 1940s. He has been quoted as claiming that "there is no connection between the war period and the company assets acquired many decades later."

Kühne died in Schindellegi on 23 August 2026, at the age of 89.

== Ownership and influence ==
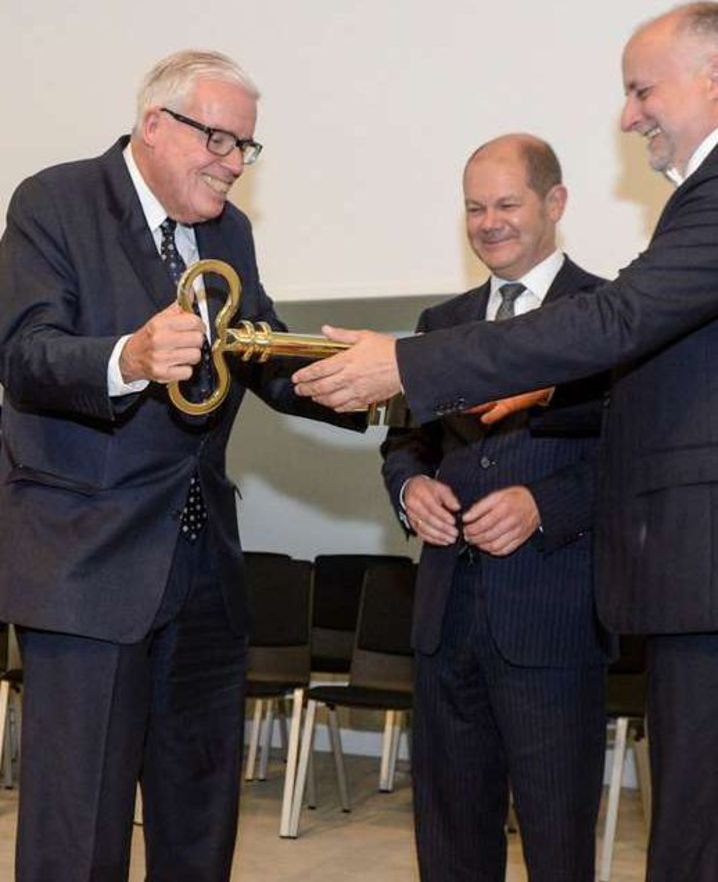
Klaus-Michael Kühne at the opening of the Kühne Logistics University with Olaf Scholz, then mayor of Hamburg (2010)

Kühne spoke out on political and global issues. He defended trade with China despite its government's human rights violations.

=== Kühne Holding AG ===
Through Kühne Holding AG, which was solely owned by Kühne, he held a 55.75 percent share in Kuehne + Nagel International AG.

=== Hapag Lloyd ===
In 2008, Kühne became a partner in the shipping company Hapag-Lloyd through the Albert Ballin consortium. He held 30 percent of the shares of Hapag Lloyd.

=== Lufthansa Group ===
Kühne held 17.5% of German airline Lufthansa Group.

In September 2022, the German state sold a large part of its Lufthansa shares as a result of the Covid crisis. Kühne bought additional shares with his Kühne Holding AG and held 17.5%. A spokeswoman for Kühne said they were happy to actively support the sales process of the "German Economic Stabilization Fund" (WSF).

== Assets ==
During the period of Nazi Germany the Kühne family fortune profited from the systematic looting of the assets of European Jews. According to German and American news media, nearly 70,000 households of deported Jewish families from France, Belgium and the Netherlands were transported by Kuehne + Nagel to Germany for so-called "Jewish Auctions". Further, the company's partner Adolf Maass, who was Jewish, was forced to leave Kuehne + Nagel and surrender his shares without compensation as part of the Nazi Aryanization campaign in 1933. Maass and his wife were later killed in a concentration camp. Klaus-Michael Kühne has made significant efforts to downplay the connection between his fortune and the Holocaust.

Klaus-Michael's father August Kühne had already moved the Kühnes' private and business residence to Switzerland. The Kühne companies continue to make their largest sales and profits in Germany. Regardless, Kühne paid no taxes in Germany. Regarding taxes on the general public, Kühne told the public broadcast station NDR in 2022: "It is well known that the state cannot handle the economy properly."

With an estimated personal fortune of approximately 14.2 billion US dollars in 2020, Kühne was ranked the 5th richest individual in Germany and 74th worldwide. On 19 May 2021 he was ranked 38th on the Bloomberg Billionaires Index with an estimated fortune of US$34.4 billion. According to the 2021 Bilanz list of richest people, his net worth was 30 billion Swiss francs.

In April 2022, he increased his stake in Lufthansa to 10.01%, or €830 million. In July 2022, he increased his share by another 5% to become the largest individual shareholder in Lufthansa Stock Company. As of December 2023, the Forbes List ranked Kühne as the 47th richest person in the world, with an estimated fortune of US$31.5 billion.

In November 2024, Kühne announced that he too was severely affected by his investment in the insolvent Signa Holding real estate company. "In total, we have lost half a billion euros at Signa Prime and thus almost our entire investment", said Kühne.

As per Forbes's list of The Richest People In The World, dated 8 March 2024, Kühne is ranked #32 with a net worth of $39.2 billion.

== Patronage and honours ==
=== The Kühne Foundation ===
Kühne was the sole founder of the non-profit Kühne Foundation (established according to Swiss regulations), to which he contributed 5 million Swiss francs annually. The foundation will bear his company's assets as well.

=== Kühne Logistics University ===
With the City of Hamburg and the Technical University of Hamburg-Harburg, Kühne founded the Hamburg School of Logistics in 2003. In 2007 it was renamed the Kühne School of Logistics and Management, from which Kühne Logistics University (KLU) in Hamburg ultimately emerged. Despite Kühne's annual investment in KLU, the business school remains completely independent from Kühne & Nagel, meaning it is not a corporate university. It offers programs in business and management, leadership, data science, and supply chain management.

Kühne also collaborated with Technische Universität Berlin to launch their International Logistics Networks department. Furthermore, the Kühne Foundation supports WHU's (Otto Beisheim School of Management in Vallendar, Germany) Kühne Center for Logistics Management and the Kühne Foundation Endowed Chair of Logistics Management. On 27 November 2008, the Otto Beisheim School of Management awarded Kühne an honorary doctorate.

In 2005, Kühne was inducted into the Logistics Hall of Fame. In 2007, he was awarded the title of honorary professor by the Hamburg Senate for his construction of the Elbphilharmonie Concert Hall and sustained commitment to the development of logistics science in the city.

=== Commitment to Hamburger SV ===
Kühne was also an investor in the Hamburger SV (HSV) soccer club in Hamburg. In the summer of 2010, he bought 33% of the rights to transfer fees of the players Dennis Aogo, Dennis Diekmeier, Paolo Guerrero, Marcell Jansen, Lennard Sowah, and Heiko Westermann for €12.5 million. He later sold his share and bought a 33% share of the transfer fees of Rafael van der Vaart in 2012 using an 8.5 million euro loan.

The professional soccer department was spun off in July 2014. A month later, Kühne gave HSV a loan for €17 million for the signing of new players. On 22 January 2015, Kühne bought a 7.5% share in the club.

For the 2015/16 season, Kühne acquired the naming rights to the HSV stadium and named it the Volksparkstadion (People's Stadium Park). He paid €4 million to maintain the naming rights each season until 2019. In the summer of 2015, Kühne financed the signing of the player Albin Ekdal. He also lent HSV €25 million that year, which they paid back one year later. On 6 February 2016 Kühne announced a new loan of €9.25 million.

In the summer of 2016, Kühne provided HSV with a loan of €38 million for the signing of new players. At the HSV member meeting on 8 January 2017 it was announced that the sum was only to be repaid if the HSV qualified for the European Cup in the next six matches. In July 2018, Kühne announced in another interview with Sport Bild that he would no longer provide financial support to HSV in the future, describing the decision as "sustainable".

=== New Hamburg Opera Building ===
In May 2022, Kühne suggested pre-financing an opera house for €300 to 400 million in Hamburg's Hafencity district and having it built by René Benko, who was behind other examples of modern real estate such as the Elbtower. The listed Hamburg State Opera would be demolished to make way for a modern real estate project. The plans sparked ongoing controversy.

== See also ==
- List of US-dollar billionaires in Germany
- Kühne School of Logistics and Management
