= UWEC =

UWEC may refer to:

- University of Wisconsin–Eau Claire
- Union Water and Electricity Company, an owner of the Fujairah power and desalination plant
- Uganda Wildlife Conservation Education Centre, located in Entebbe
- UEFA Women's Europa Cup
