= Andreas Kaplan =

German professor of marketing

Andreas M. Kaplan
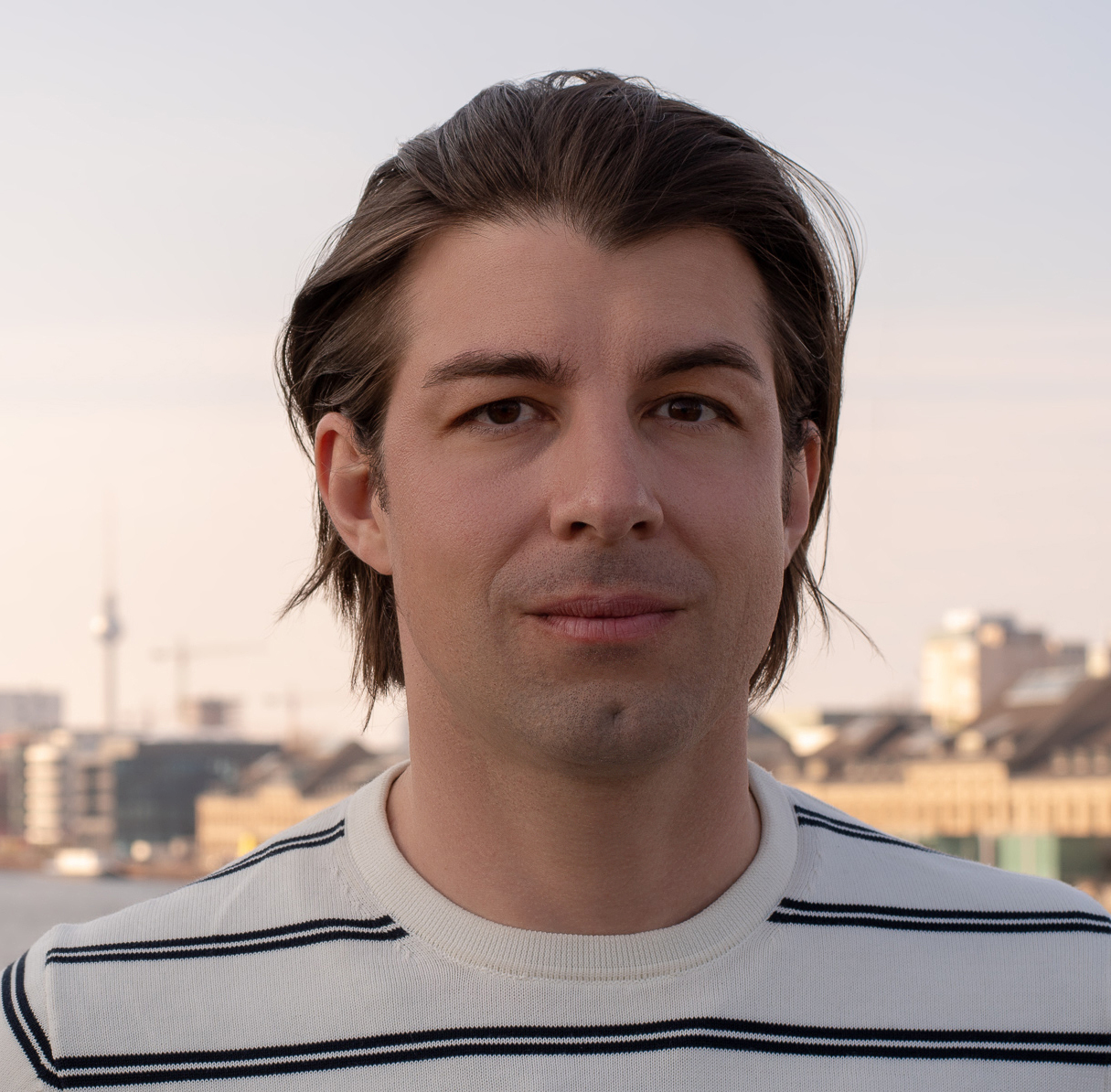
- Andreas M. Kaplan
- Born: October 5, 1977 (age 49); Munich, Germany

Academic background
- Education: École Nationale d'Administration, ESCP, HEC Paris, INSEAD, LMU Munich; Sorbonne; University of Cologne

Academic work
- Discipline: Digital Transformation; Marketing
- Institutions: ESCP Business School

Andreas Marcus Kaplan (born October 5, 1977) is a professor of digital transformation and university administrator. He is president of Kühne Logistics University, headquartered in Hamburg. Previously, he held academic leadership positions at ESCP, including as rector and dean of its business schools in Berlin and Paris. His research has addressed social media, artificial intelligence, digital transformation, and higher education.

== Education and career ==
Kaplan was born in Munich, Germany. He studied at LMU Munich, ESCP Business School, and the École nationale d'administration. He completed a doctorate at the University of Cologne and HEC Paris, and obtained his Habilitation at the Sorbonne.

Kaplan held teaching positions at ESSEC Business School and Sciences Po Paris before joining ESCP Business School as a professor of marketing in 2008. At ESCP, he later served as academic director/provost before he became rector in Berlin and later dean in Paris. He joined KLU as president, managing director, and professor of digital transformation in 2023.

== Research ==
Kaplan's early research addressed mass customization, innovation, customer lifetime valuation, and relationship marketing. His later work has examined social media, artificial intelligence, digital transformation, virtual reality, and higher education. As of August 2026, Kaplan’s work had received around 70,000 citations on Google Scholar.

Kaplan co-authored the 2010 article "Users of the World, Unite! The Challenges and Opportunities of Social Media" with Michael Haenlein. A bibliometric review identified it as the most-cited publication in the social-media literature examined by the authors, while another described its classification of social media as a central reference in research on Facebook.

Kaplan has also published on artificial intelligence. His 2019 article "Siri, Siri, in My Hand", proposed a definition and classification of AI and examined its implications for organizations. The definition describes AI in terms of a system's ability to interpret external data, learn from it, and apply that learning to achieve specific goals through flexible adaptation. It was included in a review of AI definitions by the European Commission's Joint Research Centre.

His work on higher education has addressed competition between universities, online teaching formats, and the effects of digitalization on academic institutions.

Kaplan is on the editorial boards of the California Management Review, The International Journal on Media Management, and the Journal of Global Fashion Marketing. Kaplan was included in a citation-impact database compiled by John P. A. Ioannidis and colleagues, in which his citation metrics fell within the top 2% of scientists worldwide.

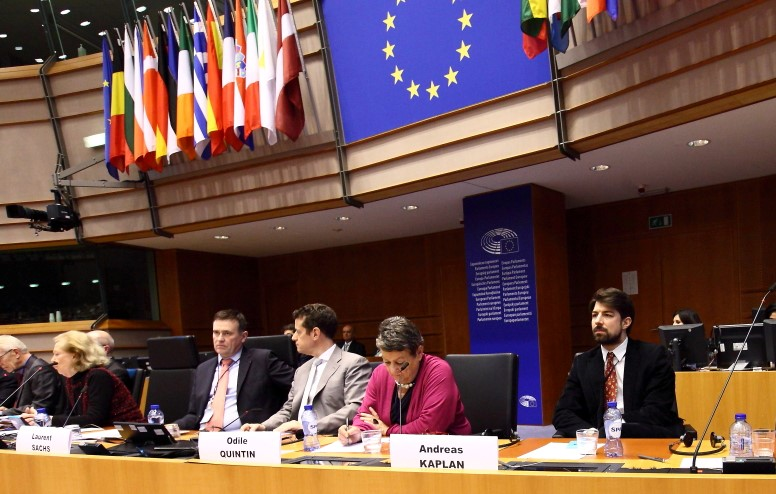
European Parliament Brussels: Nicole Fontaine, Andreas Kaplan, Odile Quintin

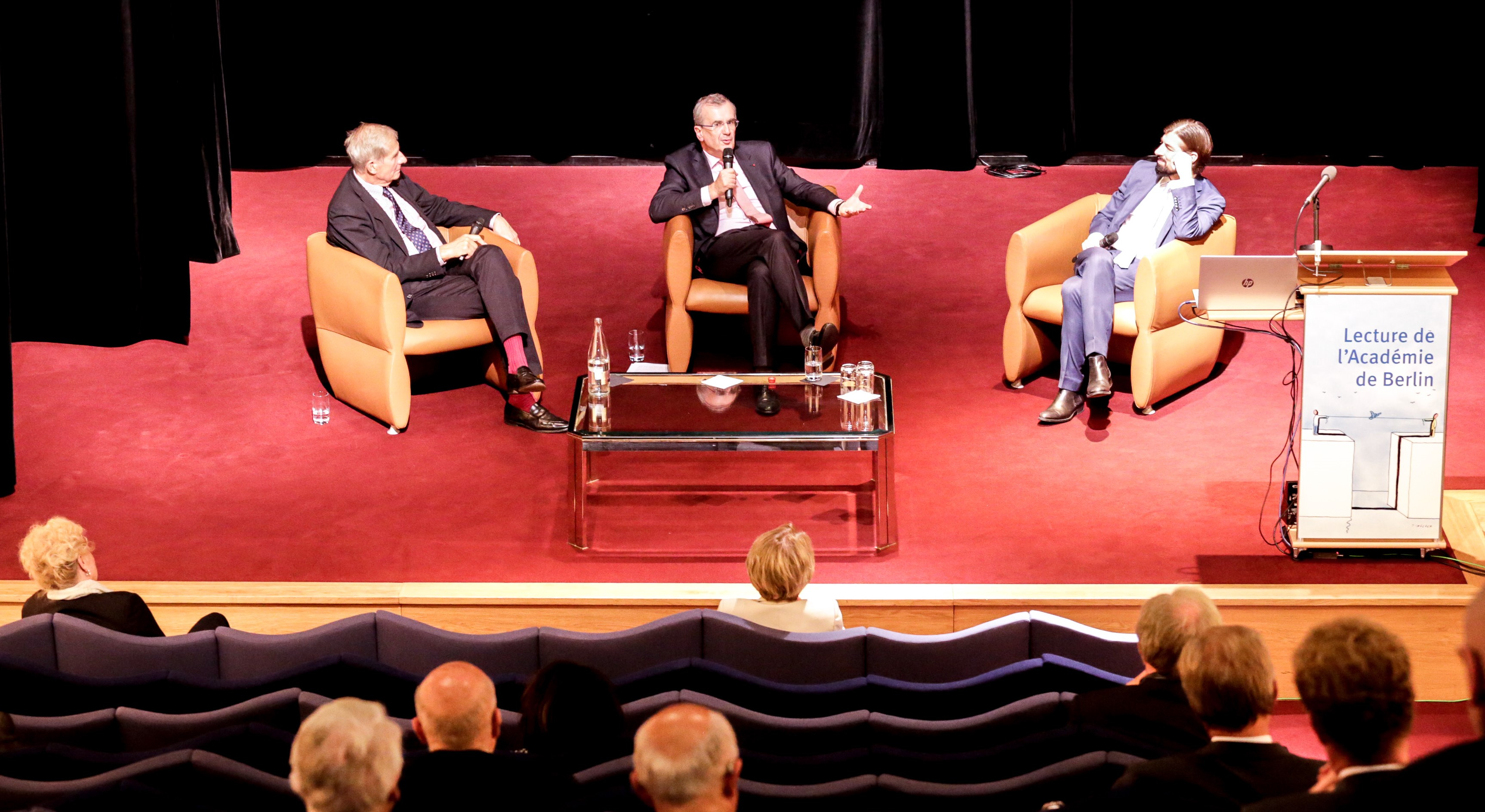
Académie de Berlin: Ulrich Wickert, François Villeroy de Galhau, Andreas Kaplan

== European management and higher education ==
Kaplan has written about European management, business education, digitalization, and European integration. In a 2014 article in the European Management Journal, he characterized Europe as having “maximum cultural diversity at minimal geographical distances” and described European management as a cross-cultural and societally oriented approach drawing on interdisciplinary principles. He subsequently edited the four-volume reference work European Business and Management, addressing cultural differences and commonalities, business ethics, interdisciplinary approaches, and management education in Europe. His writing on European higher education has examined digital teaching formats and the effects of technological change on universities. In a 2019 commentary, he argued that higher education could contribute to reducing Europe's relative disadvantage in artificial intelligence, big data, and digitalization. Kaplan has also written about European identity and the communication of EU institutions. In articles for Prospect and The Conversation, he argued that European institutions should communicate their benefits in a less technocratic and more citizen-oriented manner and that education, media, and cultural initiatives could contribute to a shared European identity. In 2025, he contributed the chapter “Für ein vereintes, vertrautes Europa” to an edited volume on the future of Europe by former European Parliament president Hans-Gert Pöttering.

== Publications ==
=== Papers ===
- Kaplan Andreas M., Haenlein Michael (2010) Users of the world, unite! The challenges and opportunities of social media, Business Horizons, 53(1), 59–68
- Kaplan, Andreas; Haenlein, Michael (2019), "Siri, Siri in my Hand, who's the Fairest in the Land? On the Interpretations, Illustrations and Implications of Artificial Intelligence", Business Horizons, 62: 15–25, doi:10.1016/j.bushor.2018.08.004, S2CID 158433736
- Haenlein Michael, Kaplan Andreas M. (2019) A brief history of artificial intelligence: On the past, present, and future of artificial intelligence, California Management Review, 61 (4), 5-14.
- Kaplan Andreas M., Haenlein Michael (2016) Higher education and the digital revolution: About MOOCs, SPOCs, social media, and the Cookie Monster, Business Horizons, Volume 59.
- Kaplan, Andreas; Haenlein, Michael (2020), "Rulers of the world, unite! The challenges and opportunities of artificial intelligence", Business Horizons, 63: 37–50, doi:10.1016/j.bushor.2019.09.003

=== Books ===
- Kaplan, Andreas (2023). Business Schools post-Covid-19: A Blueprint for Survival. United Kingdom: Francis & Taylor. ISBN 978-1-032-38104-6.
- Kaplan, Andreas (2022). Artificial Intelligence, Business and Civilization: Our Fate Made in Machines. United Kingdom: Routledge. ISBN 978-1-032-15531-9.
- Kaplan, Andreas (2022). Digital Transformation and Disruption of Higher Education. United Kingdom: Cambridge University Press. ISBN 978-1-108-83890-0.
- Kaplan, Andreas (2021). Higher Education at the Crossroads of Disruption: The University of the 21st Century, Great Debates in Higher Education. United Kingdom: Emerald Publishing. ISBN 978-1-80071-504-2.
- Kaplan Andreas (October 2015) European business and management. Sage Publications Ltd., London. ISBN 9781473925144
- Tuten T., Solomon M., Kaplan A.M. (2019) Marketing des médias sociaux, Pearson, Paris.
