= Alfred Kühne =

German businessman (1895–1981)

- Born: 14 April 1895; Bremen, German Empire
- Died: 16 October 1981 (aged 86); Lenzerheide, Switzerland
- Occupation: Businessman
- Years active: 1932–1981
- Children: Klaus-Michael Kühne

Alfred Kühne (14 April 1895 – 16 October 1981) was a German businessman, the son of August Kühne (1855–1932), the co-founder of Kuehne + Nagel, the global transportation and logistics company and a member of the Nazi Party.

== Early life ==
Alfred Kühne was born in Bremen on 14 April 1895.

== Career ==
He took over control and ownership of Kuehne + Nagel on his father's death in 1932.

== Death ==
Kühne died in Lenzerheide, Switzerland on 16 October 1981. Control of the company then passed to his only child, Klaus-Michael Kühne.

== See also ==
- M-Aktion
