= Jurong Technologies Industrial =

Singaporean company (closed 2010)

Jurong Technologies Industrial Corporation Limited was an electronics contract manufacturer based in Singapore. The company was listed on the SGX, the Singapore Stock Exchange, and it was a part of the Straits Times Index until 30 September 2010 when it was delisted.
