= Dolphin Gas Project =

Natural gas project of the United Arab Emirates, Qatar, and Oman

The Dolphin Gas Project is the natural gas project of Qatar, the United Arab Emirates, and Oman. It is the Gulf Cooperation Council's first cross-border refined gas transmission project and the largest energy-related venture ever undertaken in the region.

== History ==
The Dolphin Gas Project was conceived in 1999 to produce, process, and transport natural gas from Qatar's North Field to the UAE and Oman.

Despite the Qatar diplomatic crisis and the temporary severing of Qatar—UAE ties in 2017, the pipeline was unaffected and continued normal operations.

== Technical description ==
The project involves:

- development of gas wells and installation of two platforms in Qatar's North Field;
- two multiphase sea lines from the wellheads to the processing plant;
- gas processing and compression plant at Ras Laffan in Qatar;
- offshore pipeline from Ras Laffan to Taweelah in the UAE;
- gas receiving facilities at Taweelah.

Dolphin Energy entered the business of gas supply in January 2004 when the company commissioned the natural gas pipeline connecting Al Ain with the emirate of Fujariah (considered a separate project.[2]). Gas from Oman was supplied for the purpose which meant that gas from one GCC nation flowed to another for the very first time.

The total costs of the project are $7 billion, of which $3.5 billion are costs of the offshore pipeline.[2]

=== North Field facilities ===
The North Field facilities were designed by Foster Wheeler Sofresid. The first appraisal well was completed in April 2002, while the second appraisal well was completed in June 2002. The offshore platforms were constructed by J Ray McDermott Middle East Inc. The first gas from the wells was produced on 25 June 2007.

=== Sealines ===
Two 36-inch (910 mm) diameter concrete-coated sealines to transport the production stream from the wellheads to the Ras Laffan processing plant were designed and installed by Saipem, a subsidiary of Eni. The 80-kilometre (50 mi) long sealines were laid in 2006.

=== Ras Laffan processing plant ===
The Ras Laffan gas processing and compression plant is located at 25°55′31″N 51°30′58″E. It was designed by JGC Middle East FZE, a subsidiary of JGC Corporation. Ras Laffan is the single largest gas processing plant in the world. The six compression trains are driven by 52 MW gas turbines supplied by Rolls-Royce Energy Systems. The plant came on line in 2006 and compresses up to 2 billion cubic feet per day (57 million cubic metres per day) of refined methane gas. The by-products condensate, propane and butane, are sold on spot markets, while ethane is supplied to QatarEnergy.

=== Export pipeline ===
The offshore pipeline from Ras Laffan to Taweelah in the UAE (export pipeline) was designed by Saipem, an Italian contractor for the oil and gas industry, and the pipes were supplied by Mitsui of Japan. The 48-inch (1,200 mm) pipeline has capacity of 90.6 billion cubic metres (3.20 trillion cubic feet) of natural gas per year. The construction of the pipeline was objected by Saudi Arabia because of the border dispute between Saudi Arabia and the UAE, however the pipeline was built.

== Taweelah receiving facilities ==
The gas receiving facilities at Taweelah were constructed as adjacent to the Taweelah Power Station and comprise three parallel gas-receiving trains and associated equipment, metering facilities, control buildings, and warehouses and interconnecting pipelines to the Taweelah Power Stations and to the existing Maqta-Jebel Ali Pipeline. The facilities were designed by Technip of Abu Dhabi and Al Jaber Energy Services Consortium of the UAE. The construction was completed in 2006.

=== Al Ain – Fujairah gas pipeline ===
The Al-Ain – Fujairah pipeline is a 182 kilometres (113 mi) long 24 inches (610 mm) natural gas pipeline with capacity of 20 billion cubic metres (710 billion cubic feet) of natural gas per year. The pipeline was constructed in 2003. In 2004-2005, the pipeline was operated by the Emirates General Petroleum Corporation (Emarat), and since 2006 by Dolphin Energy. Until 2008, the pipeline is used for supplying Omani natural gas to the Fujairah power and desalination plant. Starting from November 2008, the pipeline is used for a regular natural gas export from Qatar to Oman.

=== Taweelah – Fujairah gas pipeline ===
The Taweelah – Fujairah pipeline is 244-kilometre (152 mi) long 48-inch (1,219 mm) pipeline between Taweelah gas receiving facilities and Fujairah to feed a new Fujairah based power and desalination plants. It is the longest overland natural gas pipeline in the United Arab Emirates. Five companies were invited to bid by 7 May 2008 for design and construction, and on 22 July 2008, the $418 million contract was awarded to Stroytransgaz. Coated line pipes are supplied by Salzgitter Mannesmann International. The construction started in March 2009. On May 6, 2010, the second stage of the pipeline was completed and test deliveries started through the 128-kilometre (80 mi) section. Construction of TFP was completed in November 2010.

== Project company ==
The Dolphin Gas Project is developed and operated by Dolphin Energy Limited, a company established in Abu Dhabi. It is the operator of all upstream, midstream, and downstream phases of the project. Dolphin Energy is 51% owned by Mubadala Investment Company, on behalf of the Government of Abu Dhabi, and 24.5% each owned by Total SE of France and Occidental Petroleum of the United States.

== See Also ==
- South Pars/North Dome Gas-Condensate field
- Dukhan Field
