= Friedrich Nagel =

Co-founder of Kuehne + Nagel (1864-1907)

Friedrich Gottlieb Nagel (1864-1907) was the co-founder of Kuehne + Nagel, the global transportation and logistics company.

Nagel co-founded Kuehne + Nagel with August Kühne (1855-1932) in Bremen in 1890.
