= Farrow (customs brokerage) =

Canadian customs brokerage

Russell A. Farrow (Farrow)
- Formerly: Russell A. Farrow Limited
- Company type: Limited
- Industry: Customs Brokerage; Logistics; International Trade
- Predecessor: Farrow Group; Russell A. Farrow
- Founded: 1911; 115 years ago
- Founder: Russell Alexander Farrow
- Headquarters: 2001 Huron Church Road; Windsor, Ontario; N9C 2L6
- Area served: Worldwide
- Services: Customs brokerage Customs and Trade Consulting; International Freight Forwarding; Trade Compliance Software; Logistics; Ground Transportation; Warehousing and Distribution
- Owner: Kuehne + Nagel; (2024–present)
- Number of employees: 500-1000
- Website: www.farrow.com

Farrow, legally known as Russell A. Farrow Limited., is an independently owned customs brokerage in North America. Established in 1911, it has 29 offices and warehousing locations throughout Canada, the US, Europe and Asia.

The firm is a customs brokerage and logistics provider specializing in Canadian and US customs clearance, international freight forwarding, warehousing and distribution, ground transportation, and international trade consulting.

== History ==
Russell A. Farrow Customs Brokerage, founded in 1911 by Russell Alexander Farrow, transported goods on ferry boats between Canada (Windsor) and the USA (Detroit). Russell A. Farrow’s father, Robinson R. Farrow, was the Commissioner of Canadian Customs.

Russell A. Farrow participated in the founding of the Dominion Chartered Custom House Brokers Association (DCCHBA), also known as the predecessor organization to the Canadian Society of Customs Brokers.

After Russell A. Farrow's death in 1949, the company was passed down to his wife, Alice M. Farrow, and then his two sons, Robinson(Bob) R. Farrow and Huntley J. Farrow. Until the end of 2023, the company was owned and operated by Richard J. Farrow, who is the son of Huntley J. Farrow. Richard's brother, John Farrow, is also actively involved in the company, serving as Vice Chairman.

In November 2023, it was announced that the company would be acquired by Kuehne + Nagel, a Swiss transport and logistics company. The purchase was completed on January 31, 2024.

== Acquisitions ==
Since Farrow’s establishment in 1911, it has made 22 business acquisitions, including the recent acquisitions of D&H International, All Freight International, W.Pickett and Sons, Cavalier and CK Logistics, Charles Higgerty Limited and most recently, DJ Powers. Farrow acquired National Logistics services in 2015 and later sold it in 2018.

== Services ==
Farrow provides information management services enabling users to link up electronically with the central databases to enter shipment data for submission and to keep track of import/export activities, in particular TradeSmart Connect, which provides account management, database access, reporting, and auditing capabilities. It offers services such as: customs clearance, entry processing, account management, cross-country coverage, warehousing and distribution, customs consulting, duty recovery programs, compliance verification, and dispute resolution. In addition, Farrow offers door-to-door shipping/LTL, airfreight re-forwarding and delivery, cross-border courier and warehousing services, including Free Trade Zones (FTZ) in select locations, and business-to-consumer and business-to-business merchandising services.

== See also ==
- Customs brokerage
- International freight forwarding
- Trade facilitation
- Logistics
- Third-party logistics
- Incoterms
- international trade
