= SembCorp Logistics =

Singaporean logistics company

- Type: Public
- Industry: Transportation
- Founded: Singapore
- Defunct: May 2006
- Fate: Acquired by Toll Holdings
- Successor: Toll Holdings
- Headquarters: Singapore
- Parent: Sembcorp
- Website: www.semblog.com

SembCorp Logistics Limited (also known as SembLog) was a logistics company previously linked to Sembcorp based in Singapore. It was acquired by Australian transport giant, Toll Holdings in May 2006.

Before being taken over by Toll, SembCorp Logistics was a component of the Straits Times Index of the Singapore Stock Exchange (SGX) having been incorporated on 22 February 1971 as Sembawang Towing Co Pte Ltd and listed on the SGX on 18 June 1987. Over time, the company's operations have changed from marine towing to supply chain management and offshore logistics.
