= Sembcorp =

Energy and urban development company in Singapore

- Type: Public
- Traded as: SGX: U96; Straits Times Index component
- ISIN: SG1R50925390
- Industry: Renewable energy; Natural gas; Utilities; Water management; Urban planning; Waste management; Decarbonization
- Headquarters: 30 Hill St, Singapore 179360
- Areas served: Singapore; China; India; Bangladesh; Indonesia; Myanmar; Oman; Philippines; United Arab Emirates; United Kingdom; Vietnam
- Key people: Wong Kim Yin (Group president & CEO); Graham Cockroft (Group CFO)
- Revenue: ▼ S$6,417 million (FY2024)
- Operating income: ▼ S$1,734 million (FY2024)
- Net income: ▲ S$1,019 million (FY2024)
- Owner: Temasek Holdings
- Website: www.sembcorp.com
- Footnotes; Financials as of 31 December 2024

Sembcorp Industries is a Singaporean state-owned energy and urban development company.

Sembcorp's marine division provided a variety of services, including the engineering and construction of offshore platforms for oil extraction, until it was demerged from Sembcorp in 2020 following poor financial performance. Sembcorp currently has an energy portfolio of over 12,600MW, with more than 2,600MW of renewable energy capacity globally. The company also develops raw land into urban developments.

Sembcorp is listed on the main board of the Singapore Exchange. It is a component stock of the Straits Times Index and sustainability indices including the FTSE4Good Index, the Dow Jones Sustainability Asia Pacific Index and the iEdge SG ESG indices.

== History ==
=== Sembawang Shipyard Limited (1969-1994) ===
Sembawang Shipyard Limited was formed in 1968 as a wholly-owned management body of the newly established Sembawang ship-repairing complex, under the purview of Swan Hunter. The Sembawang ship-repairing complex (or Sembawang Shipyard), which majority of premises formerly Her Majesty's Sembawang Dockyards, begun operations on 2 December 1968.

In 1984, Sembawang shipyard secured the contract to repair the damaged propeller shaft of the HMS Invincible, a British aircraft carrier. The same year also saw the diversification of Sembawang Shipyard Ltd into civil projects, with the firm securing the contract for the construction of Newton Circus MRT station and civil defence station (Newton MRT Station) through a joint venture with French company Dragages et Travaux Publics, valued at S$43 million. The joint venture also saw the transfer of technology from Dregages, which was one of the main contractors for the Hong Kong Mass Transit Railway.

=== Sembawang Corporation Limited ===
Sembawang Shipyard underwent an extensive organisational restructure between 1990 and April 1994. Its assets restructured into a single conglomerate with four sectors, namely shipyard, maritime, engineering, and industrial. The restructuring also saw a name change to Sembawang Corporation Limited, announced on 7 May 1994 to reflect its diverse business atop of shipbuilding.

=== Formation of Sembcorp Industries ===
On 1 June 1998, a joint announcement was made by Singapore Technologies Industrial Corporation (STIC) and Sembawang Corporation for the intention to merge as a single entity - Sembcorp Industries (SCI). This merger would form the largest civil engineering and building construction firm in Southeast Asia region, with a niche in infrastructure, marine engineering, information technology and lifestyle. The merger also saw SembCorp Industries assuming one of Asia's leading industrial park developers and managers, with jurisdiction of industrial parks in Indonesia, China and Vietnam. STIC and Sembawang Corporation was fully integrated under the name of Sembcorp Industries by 5 October 1998.

=== Demerger of Sembcorp Marine ===
In March 2020, it was announced that Sembcorp was replacing their CEO. Sembcorp did not declare an interim dividend for 1H 2020, instead choosing to defer any decision regarding payment of dividends for the fiscal year 2020 until the end of the year. In June of the same year, trading was halted for Sembcorp as well as Sembcorp Marine, a loss-making subsidiary whose shares had declined by 36% in 2020. Representatives from both companies declined to comment. Between 11 June and 24 July 2020, Sembcorp Industries' share price declined by 11%.

On 12 August 2020, the demerger of Sembcorp Marine (SCM) from Sembcorp Industries through a distribution in specie (4911 of SCM shares for every 1 SCI shares held) was confirmed, along with proposal of a S$2.1 billion recapitalization of the former through renounce-able right issue.

== Business ==
=== Singapore ===
Sembcorp owns and operates the largest NEWater plant in Singapore, and provides solid waste management services.

It is the only established power gentailer (generation-affiliated retailer) in Singapore to offer renewable energy. Sembcorp also has 250MWp of renewable energy capacity in operation and under development.

=== China ===
Sembcorp operates power generation, industrial water and wastewater treatment facilities, and sustainable urban developments.

Sembcorp is an investor in the China-Singapore Suzhou Industrial Park, Wuxi-Singapore Industrial Park, International Water Hub and Singapore-Sichuan Hi-tech Innovation Park.

In November 2023, Sembcorp announced it would acquire 200 MW of operational wind power assets from Qinzhou Yuanneng for S$130 million.

=== India ===
Despite their commitment to renewable energy in China and Singapore, Sembcorp constructed a 1,320-megawatt supercritical coal-fired power plant in Andhra Pradesh. In 2015, they acquired a wind and solar power company, Green Infra. In 2016, Sembcorp launched a $3 billion, 2,640-megawatt power complex in Andhra Pradesh. In 2020, Sembcorp commemorated the completion of 800MW of Solar Energy Corporation of India wind power projects. In November 2023, Sembcorp announced it would acquire 228 MW of operational wind power assets from Leap Green Energy Pvt Ltd for S$70 million.

=== United Kingdom ===
In 2003, Sembcorp acquired a centralised utilities business at Wilton International, Teesside, UK. In 2018, Sembcorp acquired UK Power Reserve, the UK's largest flexible distributed energy generator.

=== Myanmar ===
In 2015, Sembcorp pivoted away from renewable energy investments, beginning the development of a 225-megawatt gas-fired power plant (the Sembcorp Myingyan Power Plant) which officially opened in 2019. However, solar power generation was integrated into the plant.

=== Oman ===
In 2009, Sembcorp won a project to develop the US$1 billion Salalah Independent Water and Power Plant.

=== United Arab Emirates ===
In 2006, Sembcorp started work on the Fujairah 1 Independent Water and Power Plant, a 893 MW and 130 million imperial gallons per day hybrid desalination plans.

=== Vietnam ===
In 1996, the first Vietnam Singapore Industrial Park (VSIP) was established in Binh Duong province in southern Vietnam. In 2001, Sembcorp made an investment to develop the Phu My 3 independent power plant. In 2005, Sembcorp expanded its presence in southern Vietnam with VSIP Binh Duong II. In 2007, Sembcorp began a third VSIP project, VSIP Bac Ninh. In 2009, Sembcorp entered a joint venture agreement for its fourth VISP project, VSIP Hai Phong, also an integrated township and industrial park. In 2012, Sembcorp signed an agreement for a fifth project in Vietnam, VSIP Quang Ngai, and in 2015, their sixth and seventh VSIPs - VSIP Hai Duong and VSIP Nghe An. In 2019, Sembcorp signed a joint venture agreement with Becamex IDC Corporation and VSIP.

=== Bangladesh ===
In 2019, Sirajganj Unit 4 combined-cycle gas turbine power plant, Sembcorp's first thermal power plant in Bangladesh, commenced full commercial operation.

=== Indonesia ===
Sembcorp was appointed by the Singapore government in the 1990s to develop its first bilateral special economic zones, the 320-hectare Batamindo Industrial Park, on the Riau Island of Batam, and the 270-hectare Bintan Industrial Estate, on Bintan Island. Sembcorp is now developing the Kendal Industrial Park in Central Java.

=== Australia ===
In December 2025, it was announced Sembcorp would acquire Australian energy company Alinta Energy from Hong Kong-based Chow Tai Fook Enterprises for an enterprise value of A$6.5 billion. The acquisition expands Sembcorp's footprint in Australia and aligns with its strategy to increase global renewable energy capacity to 25 GW by 2028.

== See also ==
- Sembcorp Energy India
- SembCorp Logistics
- Water privatisation
