= Fujairah F1 IWPP =

IWPP facility in the United Arab Emirates

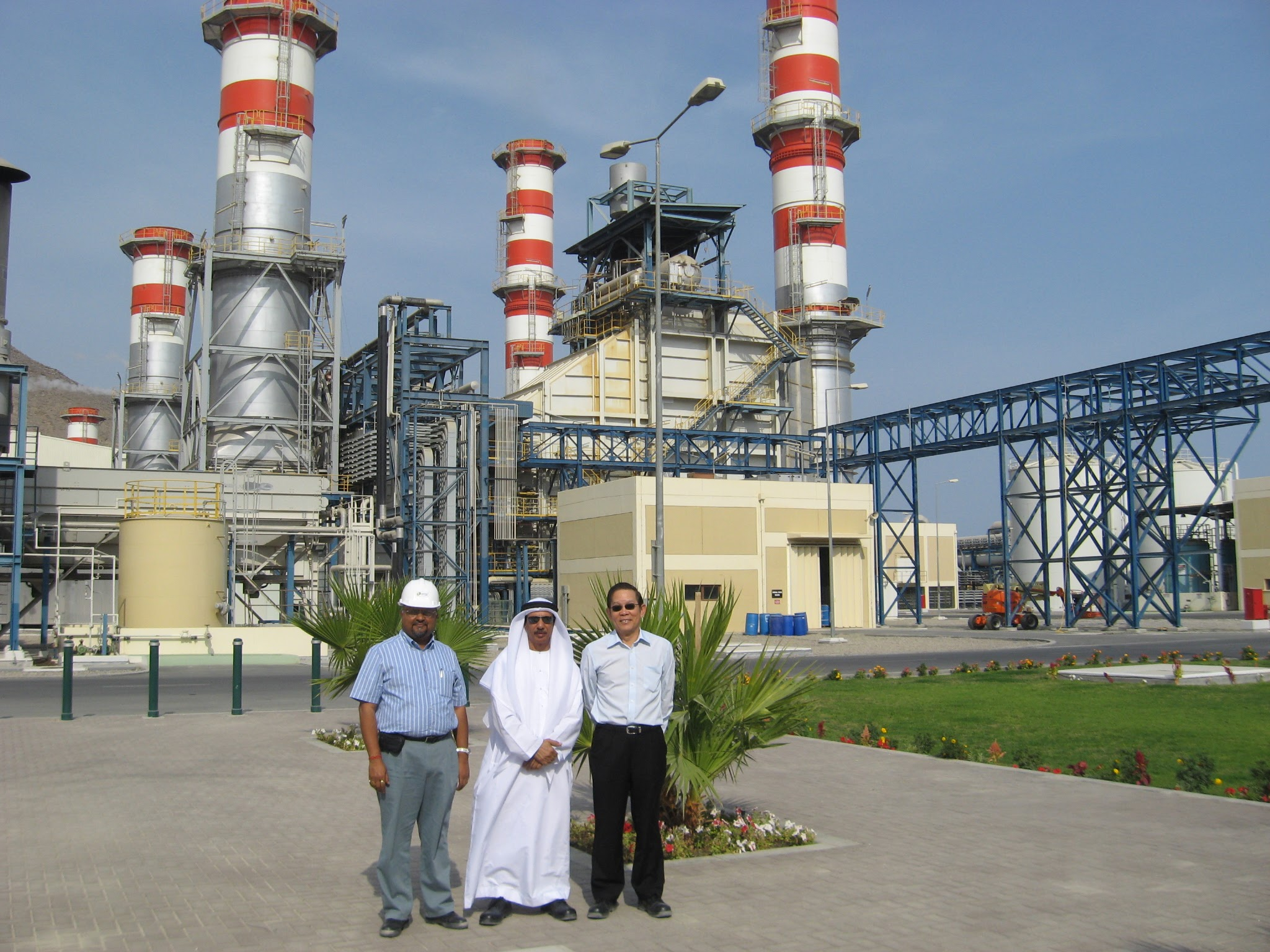
- 4 flues for thermal power generation at Fujairah F1 IWPP with the executive team in 2007
- Official name: Fujairah F1 Integrated Water and Power Plant
- Country: United Arab Emirates
- Location: Qidfa', Fujairah
- Coordinates: 25°18′52″N 56°22′22″E
- Status: Operational
- Construction began: 2002
- Commission date: 2004
- Construction cost: US$1.2 billion
- Owners: Emirates SembCorp Water and Power Company

Thermal power station
- Primary fuel: Natural gas
- Combined cycle?: Yes
- IWPP?: Yes
- IWPP purification method: distillation; reverse osmosis
- IWPP water output: 455,000 m^{3}/d (186,000 cu ft/ks)

Power generation
- Nameplate capacity: 893 MW

External links
- Website: https://www.sembcorp.com/en/global-presence/middle-east
- Commons: Related media on Commons

Fujairah F1 Independent Water and Power Plant or Fujairah F1 IWPP is an independent water and power plant (IWPP) at Qidfa', Fujairah in the United Arab Emirates. It is located next to the Fujairah F2 IWPP. It is 5 kilometres (3.1 mi) south of Khor Fakkan and 20 kilometres (12 mi) north of the city of Fujairah. When constructed, the Fujairah plant was the first hybrid plant in the Middle East, and the largest desalination hybrid plant in the world.

== History ==
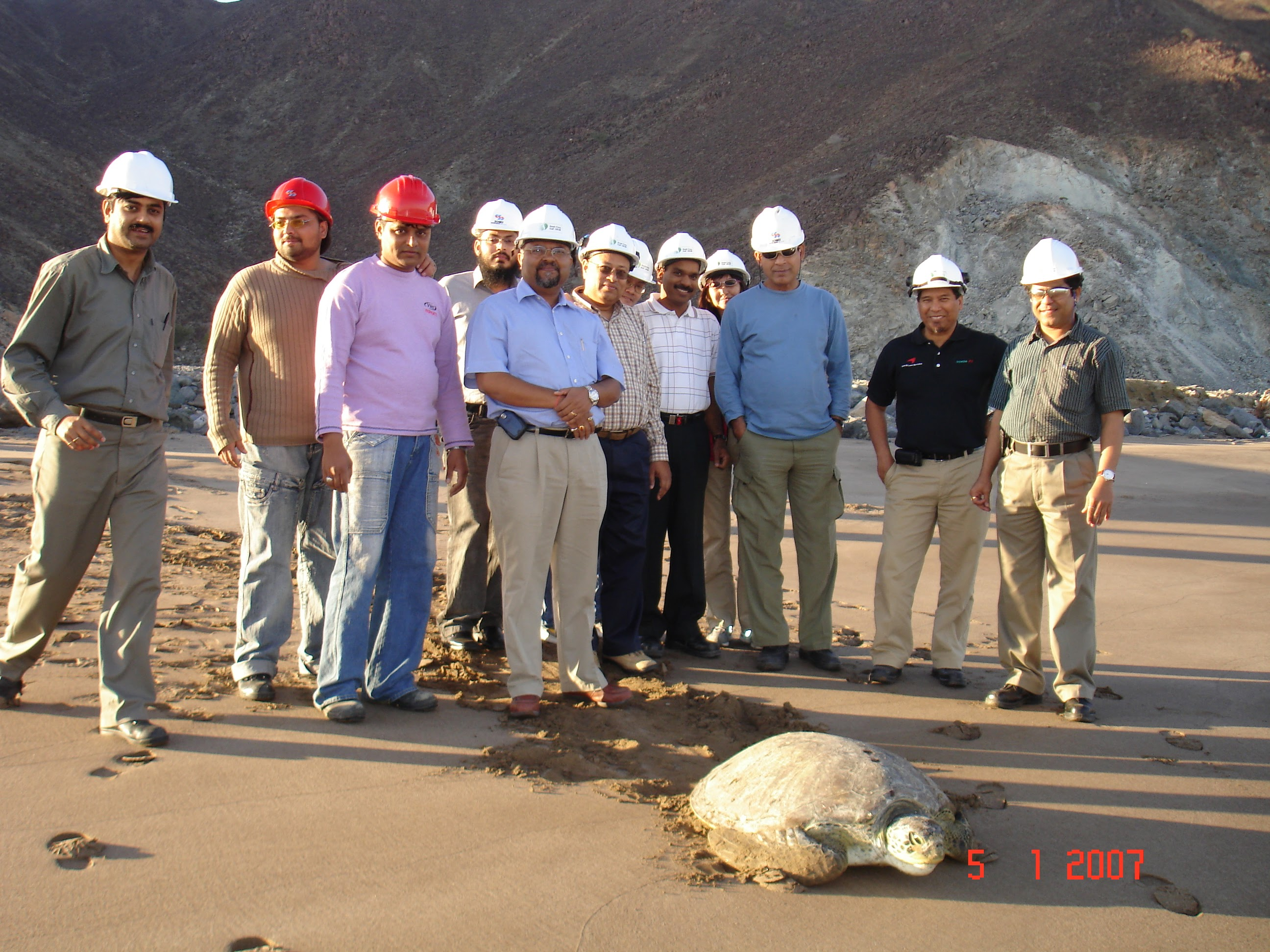
Part of the Fujairah F1 IWPP Team after removing a turtle from the water filtration system.

A construction contract was awarded to Doosan Heavy Industries & Construction Company in June 2001 and the contract was signed in June 2002. In August 2001, a contract for the transmission systems was awarded to a joint venture of Al Jaber Energy Services and Technip. The first few liters of potable water were produced in April 2004. Total construction costs of the project were US$1.2 billion In June 2009 Sembcorp had announced that it had successfully boosted F1's power capacity by at least 40%.

== Technical description ==
The Fujairah plant has an installed power capacity of 760 MW and it produces 455,000 cubic meters (16,100,000 ft^{3}) of water per day. It is a natural gas-fired plant supplied from the Dolphin Gas Project through the Al Ain-Fujairah pipeline. Its annual consumption is 1.4 billion cubic metres (49 billion cubic feet) of natural gas. Its power generating side consists of four gas turbines, two heat recovery steam generators and two steam turbines in a combined cycle configuration. 120 MW of capacity is used for the water desalination process and 36 MW accounted for the transmission lost, leaving 500 MW of capacity for supplies to the grid through a 68 kilometres (42 mi) long double circuit 400 kV transmission line.

For the water desalination, the Fujairah plant uses a combination of two different desalination technologies. 284,000 cubic meters per day (10,000,000 cu ft/d) of water is produced using multi-stage flash distillation (MSF) technology and 171,000 cubic meters per day (6,000,000 cu ft/d) of water is produced using reverse osmosis technology (RO). The water production system consists of five MSF units producing 57,000 cubic meters per day (2,000,000 cu ft/d) of water each and one RO unit. Potable water is stored in five tanks, 91,000 cubic meters (3,200,000 ft^{3}) each. The water output is pumped to Sweihan through a 179 kilometres (111 mi) dual pipeline with an 18 kilometres (11 mi) spur to Al Dhaid in Sharjah.

== Operating company ==
The plant was originally owned by the Union Water and Electricity Company (UWEC), established in June 2001 as a government owned company through the Abu Dhabi Water and Electricity Authority (ADWEA). The plant was operated and maintained by Sogex Oman under agreement with UWEC. In 2006, 40% stake in UWEC was sold to Singapore-based Sembcorp Utilities and SembCorp took over the plant's operating activities. After privatization the company was renamed Emirates SembCorp Water and Power Company.

Emirates Sembcorp Water & Power Co issued $400 million of senior secured project bonds in 2017 rated A2 by Moody's and rated A− by S&P. The offering was led by Citigroup and HSBC. Debt offerings like these are relatively new to the Middle East.

== Future expansion ==
According to the privatization agreement, the power capacity of the Fujairah plant would be expanded by 225 MW and water production would be expanded by 136,382 cubic meters (4,816,300 ft^{3}) of water per day. The DBO work was completed in December 2015 & currently the Plant is under Acciona Infrastructures SA & Acciona Agua JV.The Plant uses Dissolved Air flotation (DAF) & Dual media filter (DMF) for pre-treatment of the raw water.

== See also ==
- Reverse osmosis plant
- Fujairah F2 IWPP
