= Sembcorp Energy India =

Sembcorp Green Infra Ltd
- Type: Public
- Industry: Renewable Energy
- Founded: 2008; 18 years ago, in New Delhi, India
- Headquarters: Gurgaon, India
- Key people: Vipul Tuli (President and CEO - Renewables West)
- Parent: Sembcorp Industries

Sembcorp Green Infra Limited is an independent power company in India. It develops and operates wind and solar power generation assets totalling more than 7.6 gigawatts capacity in operation and under construction in India. Sembcorp Green Infra is part of the Sembcorp Industries Group.

== Sembcorp Green Infra ==
Sembcorp Green Infra is a renewable energy company that generates power and currently operating in India. Sembcorp Green Infra is a wholly owned subsidiary of Sembcorp Utilities PTE LTD.

In 2015, Sembcorp acquired a majority stake in an Indian renewable energy firm, since renamed Sembcorp Green Infra. In August 2017, Sembcorp entered into an agreement to acquire IDFC Private Equity Fund III's remaining stake in Sembcorp Green Infra.

As of (September) 2025 Sembcorp Green Infra's business consists of more than 6,900 megawatts of wind and solar power assets in operation and under development in 13 states across India.

Sembcorp has the largest generating capacity commissioned from SECI wind auctions. The company also has a self-operating capacity of more than 1,100 MW, the largest with any independent power producer in the renewable sector in India.

== See also ==
- Solar power in India
