= Thomas Strothotte =

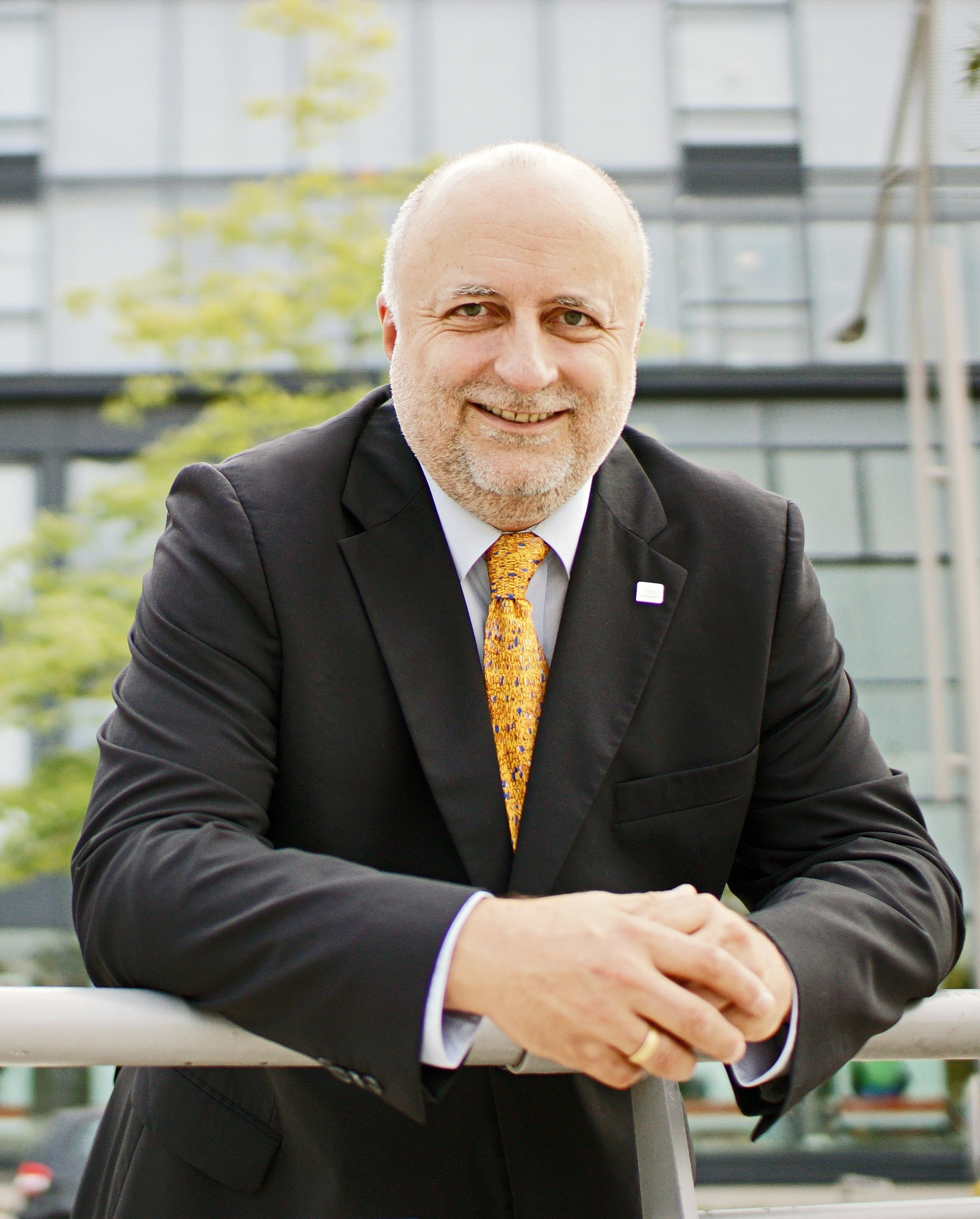
Prof. Dr. Thomas Strothotte

Thomas Strothotte (born 1959) is a German-Canadian computer scientist and university administrator currently living in Germany.

Strothotte was born in 1959 in Regina, Canada, and raised in Vancouver. His first degrees were taken at Simon Fraser University (a B.Sc. in Physics (1980) and an M.Sc. in Computer Science (1981)). His further graduate work was done in Computer Science at the University of Stuttgart, McGill University in Montréal/Québec and the University of Waterloo/Ontario, leading to a Ph.D. in 1984. He also holds an MBA from Columbia University (New York) and an MBA from the London Business School (UK).

After a year as a postdoctoral fellow at INRIA Rocquencourt near Paris, he went to the University of Stuttgart as an assistant professor in 1985, earning a D.Sc. (habil) degree in Computer Science in 1989. From 1989 to 1990 he was a visiting scientist at the IBM Scientific Center in Heidelberg, working in the Software Ergonomics Department. From there he went to the Free University of Berlin in 1990 as a professor of computer science.

He moved on to the University of Magdeburg in Germany in 1993, where he was the head of the Computer Graphics and Interactive Systems Laboratory. He was the dean of his faculty from 1994 to 1996 and again later on from 2005 to 2006. From April 1996 until September 1998 he was a vice-president of academic planning and budget development of the University; from July until September 1998 he was also president pro tem of the University. He was also the initiator and one of the scientific responsibles for the new degree programme in Computational Visualistics.

From March 2001 to December 2002 he served as the director of IT for the government of the State of Saxony-Anhalt.

From 2006 until 2008 he was the rector of the University of Rostock and from 2009 to 2013 he served as the new Rector of the University of Regensburg in the State of Bavaria (Germany).

From August 2013 until 2022 he was president of the Kühne Logistics University, a private, state-recognized and independent university based in Hamburg, Germany.

He is the founder of two private schools in Magdeburg.

== See also ==
- List of University of Waterloo people
