= The International Journal on Media Management =

Peer-reviewed academic journal

- Language: English
- Edited by: Bozena Mierzejewska

Publication details
- History: 1999–present
- Publisher: Routledge
- Frequency: Quarterly

Standard abbreviations
- ISO 4: Int. J. Media Manag.

Indexing
- ISSN: 1424-1277 (print); 1424-1250 (web)
- OCLC no.: 609925386

Links
- Journal homepage; Journal website

The International Journal on Media Management is a peer-reviewed academic journal published by Routledge from Taylor & Francis. It provides a global examination of the fields of media and telecommunications management, with a strong emphasis on management issues. The journal was established in 1999 with Beat Schmid as founding editor. Alan B. Albarran became its second editor. Since 2015, its editor-in-chief has been Bozena Mierzejewska (Fordham University).

== Editors ==
The following persons have been editor-in-chief of the journal:

- 2015–present: Bozena I. Mierzejewska (Fordham University)
- 2008–2014: Bozena I. Mierzejewska (Fordham University) and Dan Shaver (Elon University)
- 2004–2007: Alan B. Albarran (University of North Texas)
- 1999–2003: Beat F. Schmid (University of St. Gallen)

== Indexing ==
The International Journal on Media Management is currently indexed in:

- Cabell's Directory
- CIOS
- EBSCOhost
- SCOPUS
- IBZ
- LexisNexis
- OCLC
- ProQuest
- PAIS International
- SAGE
