= Qidfa =

- Location within United Arab Emirates Location within Persian Gulf
- Coordinates: 25°18′0″N 56°21′30″E
- Country: United Arab Emirates
- Emirate: Fujairah
- Elevation: 8 m (26 ft)

Qidfa is a settlement and oasis in Fujairah, United Arab Emirates (UAE). It is the site of the Fujairah power and desalination plant, the largest in the UAE.

Qidfa Oasis is the location of a Wadi Suq period (2,000 to 1,300 BCE) burial, a distinctive horse-shoe shaped tomb which is displayed at the Fujairah National Museum. The find at Qidfa was unusual in that the site yielded hundreds of weapons and vessels, including longswords, bows and arrows.
