= Kühne Logistics University =

Business school and university in Germany

Coordinates: 53°32′26″N 9°59′39″E

KLU: Kuehne Logistics University
- Type: state-accredited Business School & University
- Established: September 2010
- Affiliations: AACSB, FIBAA
- President: Professor Andreas Kaplan
- Dean: Alexander Himme (programs), Marianne Jahre (research)
- Faculty: 80
- Location: Hamburg, Germany
- Website: www.klu.org

Kuehne Logistics University (KLU) is a private business school based in Hamburg, Germany. It was founded by the Kuehne Foundation of German billionaire Klaus-Michael Kühne, based in Schindellegi, Switzerland. KLU offers bachelor's degrees and four master's programs, a part-time MBA, and a structured PhD program in business and management, analytics and data science, and operations and supply chain management. KLU is located at Hamburg's HafenCity area and its classes are taught in English. In September 2025, a new campus was established in Ho Chi Minh City, Vietnam.

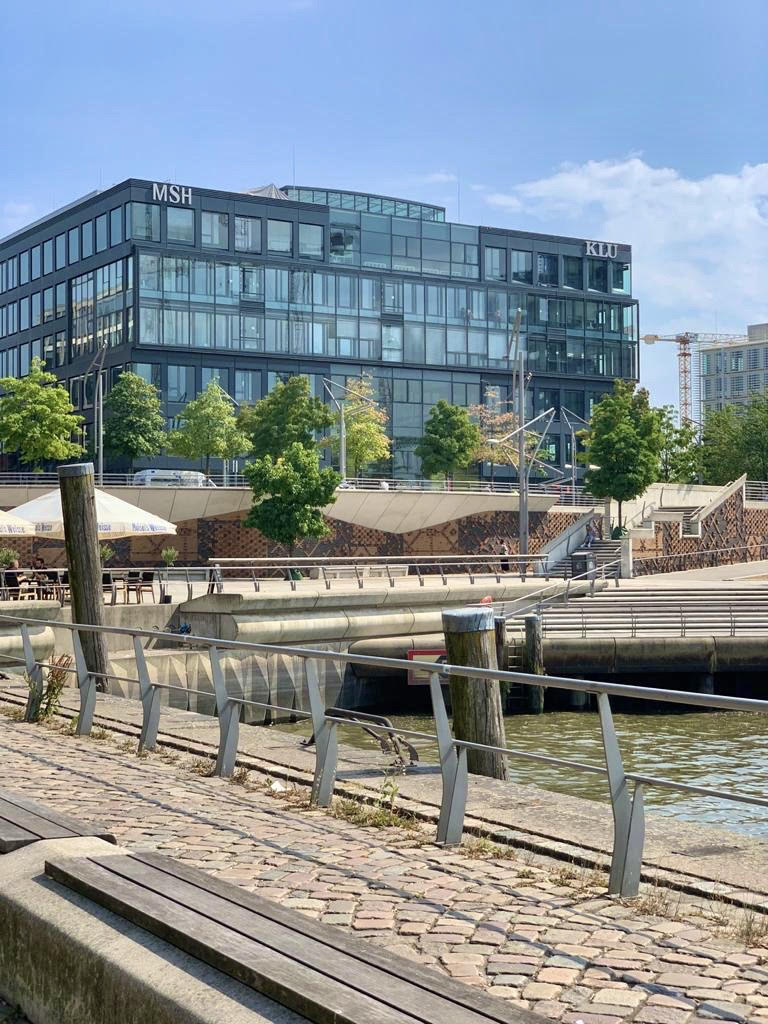
The Kühne Logistics University (KLU) located in the Hafencity, Hamburg

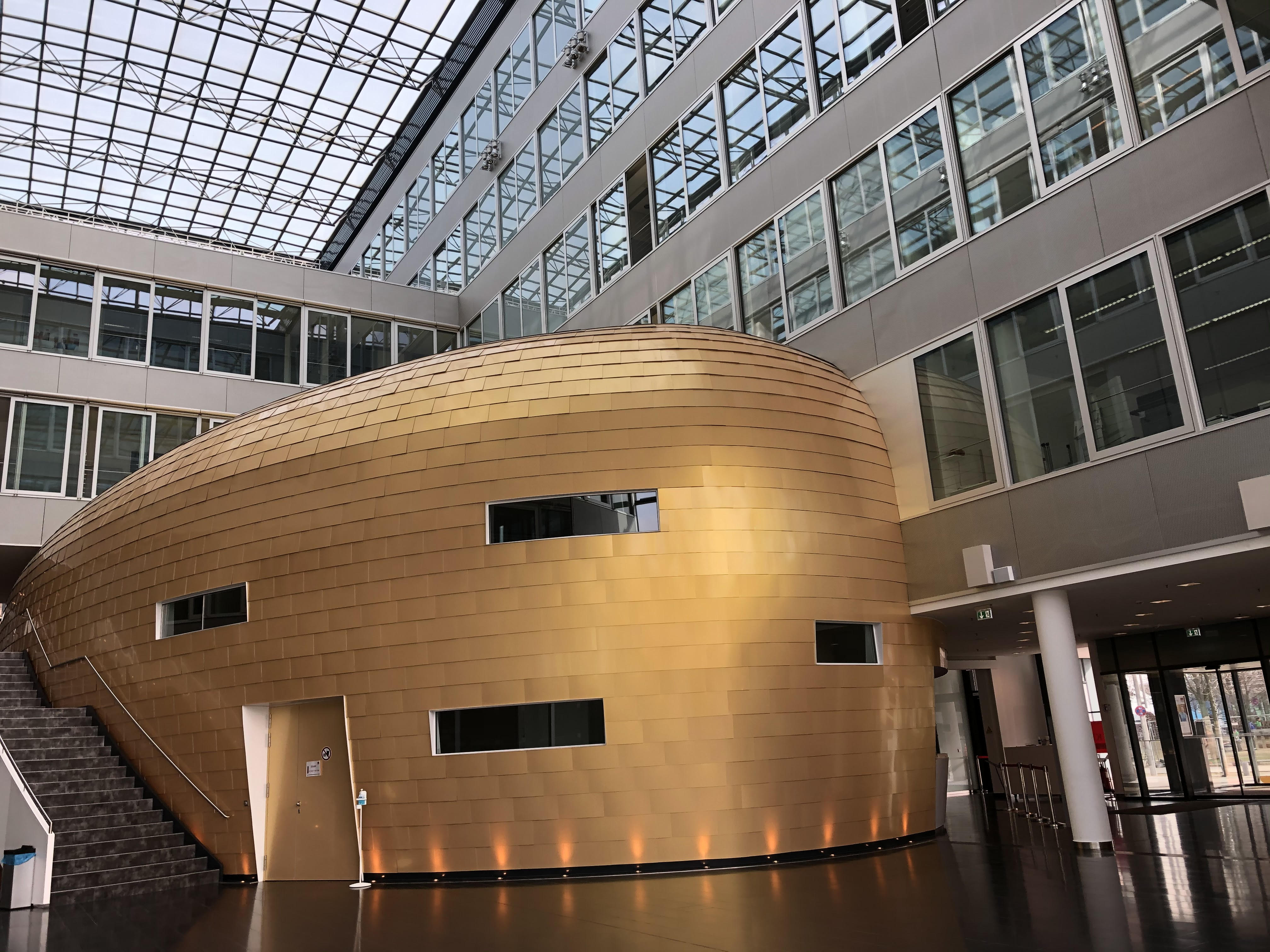
Golden lecture hall inside KLU

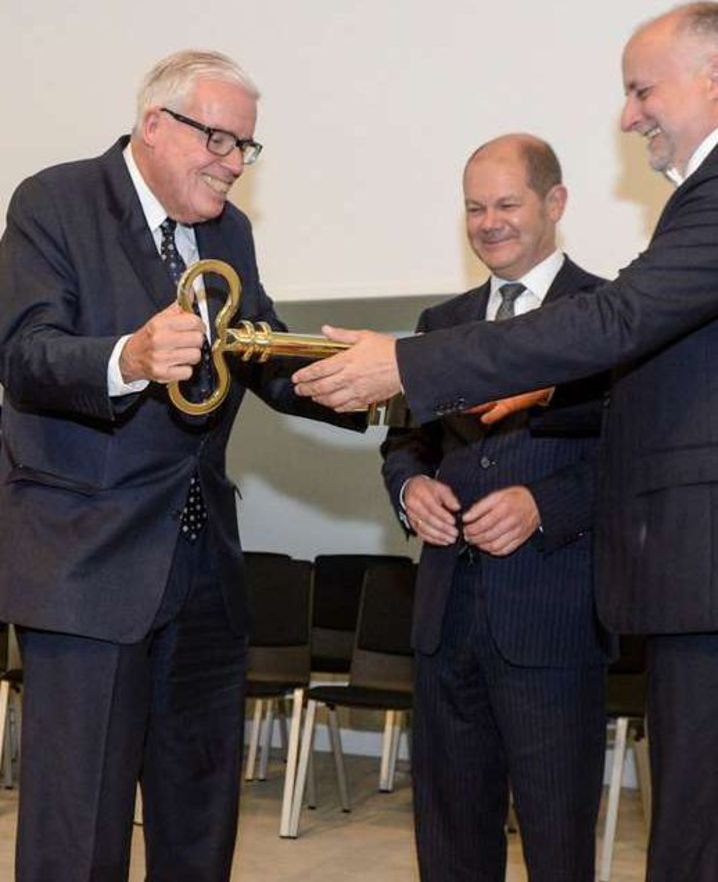
KLU Opening Ceremony: Klaus-Michael Kühne, Olaf Scholz, & Thomas Strothotte

== History ==
Kühne Logistics University was established by Klaus-Michael Kühne in 2010. Since its inception, KLU has steadily expanded its offerings to include a broader range of business and management programs, as well as analytics and data science.

KLU Foundation and Milestones

- 2010 Founding and German state-recognition of KLU
- 2012 KLU awarded the Erasmus University Charter by the European Union
- 2013 Opening of KLU’s campus in the HafenCity by Olaf Scholz
- 2017 KLU granted the right to confer PhD degrees
- 2021 KLU wins the Global Student Satisfaction Award by Studyportals
- 2024 Obtaining of AACSB accreditation
- 2025 Opening of KLU's campus in Ho Chi Minh City, Vietnam.

== Programs ==
KLU offers international programs, which are taught exclusively in English:

- Bachelor of Science (BSc) in Business Administration with four profiles: international management, sustainable management, supply chain management, and digital management & innovation. Besides the 'standard track' with 180 ECTS-credits and an integrated internship, KLU also offers an 'intensive track' with 210 ECTS-credits and two internships.
- Master of Science (MSc) in Global Logistics & Supply Chain Management
- Master of Science (MSc) in International Management
- Master of Science (MSc) in Business Analytics and Data Science
- Doctoral Program (PhD)
- MBA Leadership & Supply Chain Management

== Study costs & scholarships ==
Study costs as of October 2026, the tuition fee for the 2-years Master´s programs are 8,800€ per semester. The fees for the 3 year Bachelor´s program are 7,900€ per semester for the standard track and 8,850€ per semester for the fast track. The part-time MBA has a total cost of 34,800€.

Scholarships

At KLU there are several scholarship possibilities, which support and encourage students financially, e.g.:

- Deutschlandstipendium (Germany Scholarship)
- Merit-based scholarships
- Need-based scholarships
- Scholarships for specific nationals (Latin America, Southeast Asia)
- Sport Scholarship: KLU is a partner university for competitive sports and is in mutual exchange with the Olympic Training Center Hamburg/Schleswig-Holstein and the General German University Sports Association (adh)
- Gifted Education Awards (Begabtenförderungswerke)
- Tuition Waiver for refugees

== Erasmus ==
In July 2012, KLU was awarded the Erasmus University Charter. Through this European Union program, partnership agreements between European universities are facilitated, students can receive EU funding for stays abroad (language courses, semesters and internships abroad), and the mobility of teachers and university staff across Europe is also supported.

== Partner Universities ==
KLU maintains more than 60 partnerships with universities worldwide, within the framework of which an exchange of students from the Faculty of Economics takes place. Among the partner universities are:

Country	University/Universities	City
Belgium	Katholieke Universiteit Leuven – Hogeschool	Brussels
Chile	Universidad Técnica Federico Santa María	Valparaíso
China	Sino-German College (CDHK), Tongji University University of Nottingham Ningbo China	Shanghai Ningbo
France	EM Strasbourg Business School	Strasbourg
Greece	The American College of Greece (DEERE)	Athens
India	S.P. Jain Institute of Management & Research	Mumbai
Iceland	Reykjavík University	Reykjavík
Italy	University of Trieste	Trieste
Colombia	Universidad de los Andes	Bogotá
Mexico	Universidad Panamericana	Mexico City
Netherlands	Center for Maritime Economics and Logistics (MEL), Erasmus University	Rotterdam
Austria	Vienna University of Economics and Business University of Klagenfurt	Vienna Klagenfurt
Russia	Moscow State University of Economics, Statistics and Informatics	Moscow
Sweden	Chalmers University of Technology	Gothenburg
Singapore	National University of Singapore	Singapore
South Africa	Stellenbosch University	Stellenbosch
Thailand	Thammasat Business School	Bangkok
Turkey	Koç University	Istanbul
Uruguay	Universidad de Montevideo	Montevideo
United States	Fisher College of Business at Ohio State University Quinnipiac University Haslam College of Business at the University of Tennessee	Columbus, Ohio Hamden, Connecticut Knoxville, Tennessee

== Former presidents ==
- Wolfgang Peiner (2010-2012), German politician (CDU), statutory auditor and manager
- Thomas Strothotte (2013-2022), German-Canadian computer scientist and manager
- Andreas Kaplan (since 2023), German manager, MA in Public Administration

== Members of the supervisory board ==
- Jörg Dräger, President
- Karl Gernandt, German manager, involved in HSV Fußball AG and Hapag Lloyd
- Klaus-Michael Kühne, founder and financier
- Thomas Staehelin, Swiss real estate manager
