= August Kühne =

German businessman (1855–1932)

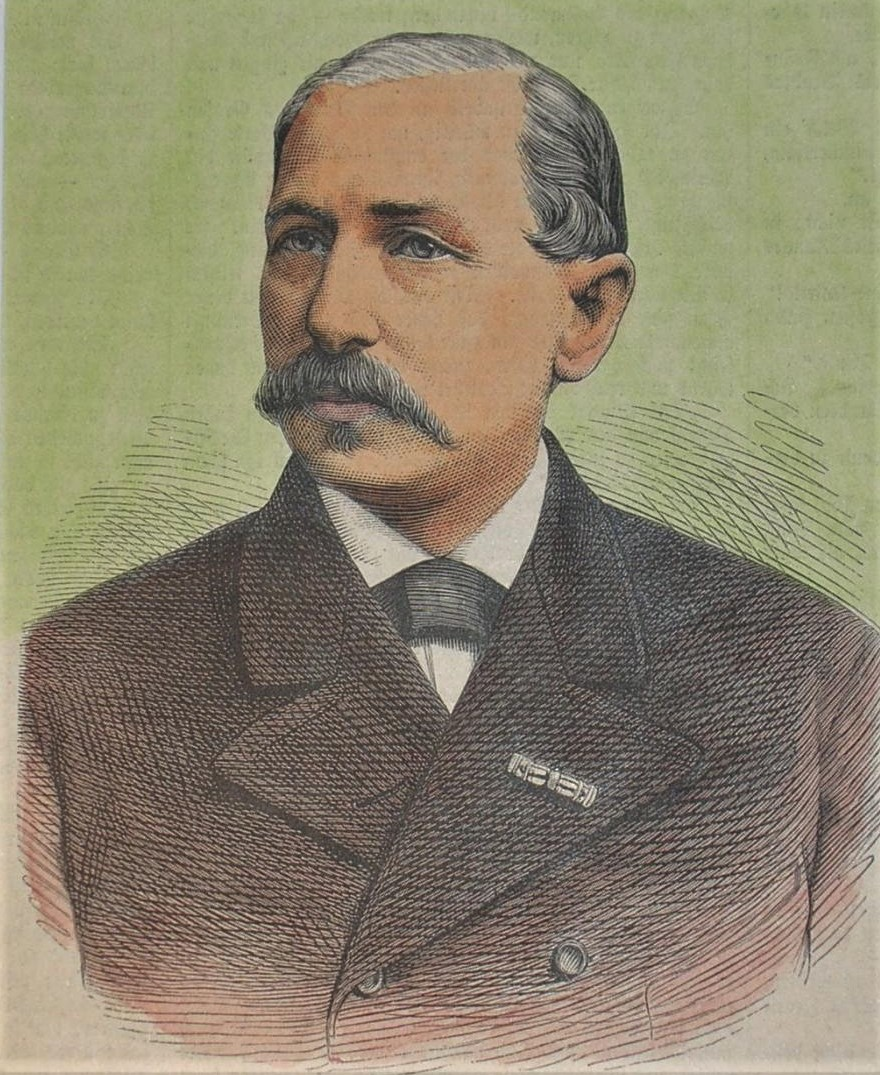
- Born: 1855
- Died: 1932 (aged 76–77)
- Occupations: Businessman; freight forwarder

August Kühne (1855 – 1932) was a German businessman and freight forwarder. In 1890, he co-founded Kühne + Nagel together with Friedrich Nagel (1864–1907) in Bremen.

== Life ==
August was the son of a woodcutter. His intention was to study law, but was unable to do so due to financial reasons. Needing another career path, he became an apprentice at the Bremens import/export company L.G. Dyes & Co. He perfected his education but was dismissed during the economic crisis of 1875.

Eventually he took a job at freight handler Fr. Nauman in Bremen. He worked his way up to partner and became engaged to Naumann's daughter, though she died before they could be married. Kühne left the company in 1890 after a disagreement with Naumann to start Kühne + Nagel.
