= Straits Times Index =

Singaporean stock market index

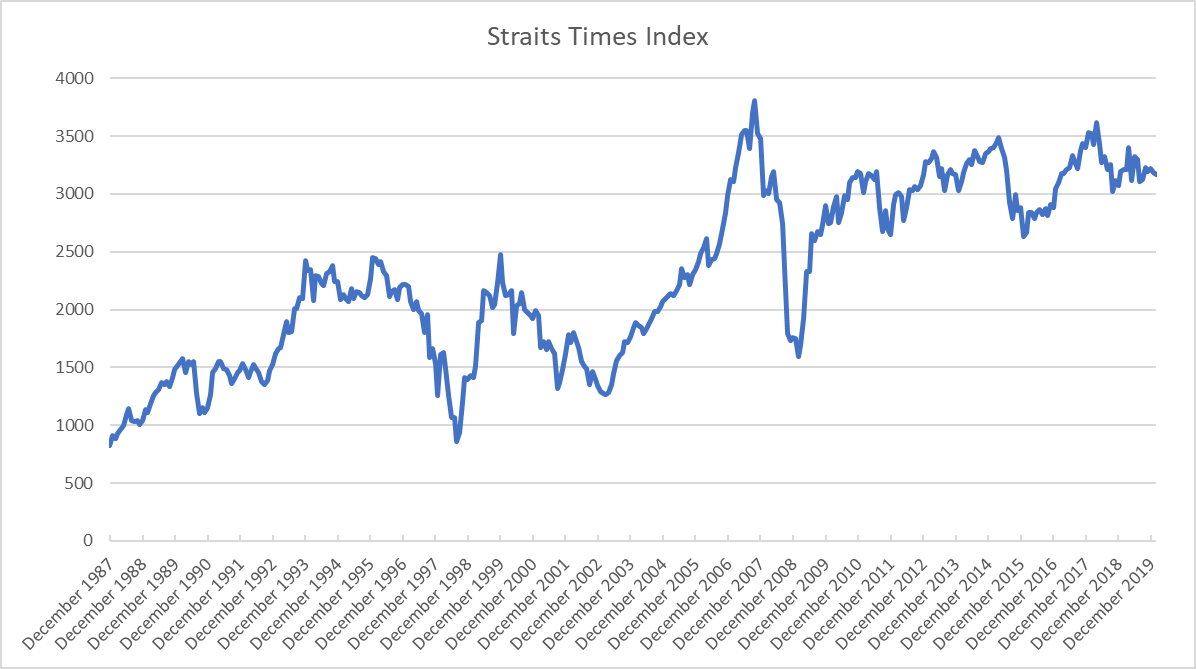
- Historical graph of the STI from 1987 to 2019
- Foundation: 15 September 1966; 59 years ago
- Operator: FTSE Group; SPH Data Services Pte Ltd
- Exchanges: Singapore Exchange
- Constituents: 30
- Type: Large cap
- Market cap: S$288.8 billion (as of June 2018)
- Weighting method: Capitalisation-weighted
- Website: FTSE STI

The FTSE Straits Times Index (abbreviation: STI) is a capitalisation-weighted stock market index that is regarded as the benchmark index for the stock market in Singapore. It tracks the performance of the top 30 companies that are listed on the Singapore Exchange (SGX).

The STI is jointly calculated by the SGX, SPH Media Trust and FTSE Group.

== History ==
=== Early years ===
The STI has a history dating back to its founding in 1966. Following a major sectoral re-classification of listed companies by the Singapore Exchange, which saw the removal of the "industrials" category, the STI replaced the previous Straits Times Industrials Index (abbreviation: STII) and began trading on 31 August 1998 at 885.26 points, in continuation of where the STII left off. At the time, it represented 78% of the average daily traded value over a 12-month period and 61.2% of total market capitalisation on the exchange.

The STI was constructed by SPH, the Singapore Exchange and SPH's consultant, Professor Tse Yiu Kuen from the Singapore Management University (formerly from the National University of Singapore). It came under formal review at least once annually and was also reviewed on an ad hoc basis when necessary. One such review, for instance, raised the number of stocks from 45 to 50, which took effect when trading resumed on 18 March 2005. This change reduced the index representation of the average daily traded value to 60%, while increasing its total market capitalisation to 75%.

=== Revamp ===
The STI was again revamped and relaunched on 10 January 2008. As part of a new partnership between SPH, SGX and FTSE, the number of constituent stocks was reduced from about 50 to 30 and the index was re-calculated using FTSE's methodology. Besides the STI, the partners also developed a family of indices including the FTSE ST Dividend Index, FTSE ST China Top tradable index, FTSE ST Catalist Index and FTSE ST Maritime Index as well as 19 Supersector and 39 Sector indices. For the purposes of computing the indices, stocks are classified using the Industry Classification Benchmark (ICB).

The family tree of the FTSE ST Index Series:

- FTSE ST All-Share Index
  - Straits Times Index
  - FTSE ST Mid Cap Index
  - FTSE ST Small Cap Index
  - FTSE ST China Index
    - FTSE ST China Top Index
  - FTSE ST Maritime Index
  - FTSE ST All-Share Industry Indices (10)
    - FTSE ST All-Share Supersector Indices (19)
      - FTSE ST All-Share Sector Indices (39)
    - FTSE ST Real Estate Index
      - FTSE ST Real Estate Investment & Services Index
      - FTSE ST Real Estate Investment Trusts Index
- FTSE ST Fledgling Index

The creation of the FTSE ST Index Series was intended to facilitate the creation of financial products such as institutional and retail funds, exchange-traded funds (ETFs), derivatives contracts and other index-linked products. There are currently two ETFs listed on the SGX that track the STI: the SPDR Straits Times Index ETF (formerly known as the streetTRACKS Straits Times Index Fund) (managed by State Street Global Advisors) and the Amova STI ETF (formerly known as Nikko AM Singapore STI ETF) (managed by Amova Asset Management).

On 12 February 2026, the ST Index surpassed the 5,000 mark, hitting a historic milestone. The benchmark index soared as high as 5,004.02 at 9.15 am, up by 0.4 per cent or 19.44 points, driven by gains made by its constituents, including the three Singapore banks, which account for about half of the STI by index weight. The STI ended the day at 5,016.76, after gaining 0.7 per cent or 32.18 points.

== Record values ==
Category	All-Time Highs	
Closing	5,801.96	Friday, 4 September 2026
Intraday	5,828.50	Friday, 4 September 2026

== Annual Returns ==
The following table shows the annual development of the Straits Times Index, which was calculated back to 1970.

Year	Closing level	Change in index	
Year	Closing level	In points	In %
1970	139.06		
1971	198.69	59.63	42.88
1972	432.73	234.04	117.79
1973	265.57	−167.16	−38.63
1974	150.82	−114.75	−43.21
1975	236.76	85.94	56.98
1976	254.81	18.05	7.62
1977	264.24	9.43	3.70
1978	349.16	84.92	32.14
1979	435.41	86.25	24.70
1980	660.82	225.41	51.77
1981	780.78	119.96	18.15
1982	732.32	−48.46	−6.21
1983	1,002.03	269.71	36.83
1984	812.61	−189.42	−18.90
1985	620.04	−192.57	−23.70
1986	891.30	271.26	43.75
1987	823.58	−67.72	−7.60
1988	1,038.62	215.04	26.11
1989	1,481.33	442.71	42.62
1990	1,154.48	−326.85	−22.06
1991	1,490.70	336.22	29.12
1992	1,524.40	33.70	2.26
1993	2,425.68	901.28	59.12
1994	2,239.56	−186.12	−7.67
1995	2,266.54	26.98	1.20
1996	2,216.79	−49.75	−2.19
1997	1,529.84	−686.95	−30.99
1998	1,392.73	−137.11	−8.96
1999	2,479.58	1,086.85	78.04
2000	1,926.83	−552.75	−22.29
2001	1,623.60	−303.23	−15.74
2002	1,341.03	−282.57	−17.40
2003	1,764.52	423.49	31.58
2004	2,066.14	301.62	17.09
2005	2,347.34	281.20	13.61
2006	2,985.83	638.49	27.20
2007	3,482.30	496.47	16.63
2008	1,761.56	−1,720.74	−49.41
2009	2,897.62	1,136.06	64.49
2010	3,190.04	292.42	10.09
2011	2,646.35	−543.69	−17.04
2012	3,167.08	520.73	19.68
2013	3,167.43	0.35	0.01
2014	3,365.15	197.72	6.24
2015	2,882.73	−482.42	−14.34
2016	2,880.76	−1.97	−0.07
2017	3,402.92	522.16	18.13
2018	3,068.76	−334.16	−9.82
2019	3,222.83	154.07	5.02
2020	2,843.81	−379.02	−11.76
2021	3,123.68	279.87	9.84
2022	3,251.33	127.65	4.09
2023	3,240.27	−11.06	−0.34
2024	3,787.60	547.33	16.89
2025	4,646.21	858.61	22.67

== Constituents ==
The 30 constituents of the STI as of 2 May 2026 are:

List of STI constituents
Stock symbol	Company
SGX: A17U	CapitaLand Ascendas REIT
SGX: C38U	CapitaLand Integrated Commercial Trust
SGX: 9CI	CapitaLand Investment
SGX: C09	City Developments Limited
SGX: D05	DBS Group Holdings
SGX: D01	DFI Retail Group Holdings Limited
SGX: J69U	Frasers Centrepoint Trust
SGX: BUOU	Frasers Logistics & Commercial Trust
SGX: G13	Genting Singapore PLC
SGX: H78	Hongkong Land Holdings
SGX: J36	Jardine Matheson Holdings Limited
SGX: BN4	Keppel Corporation
SGX: AJBU	Keppel DC Reit
SGX: ME8U	Mapletree Industrial Trust
SGX: M44U	Mapletree Logistics Trust
SGX: N2IU	Mapletree Pan Asia Commercial Trust
SGX: O39	OCBC Bank
SGX: S58	SATS
SGX: 5E2	Seatrium Limited
SGX: U96	Sembcorp Industries
SGX: C6L	Singapore Airlines
SGX: S68	Singapore Exchange
SGX: Z74	Singtel
SGX: S63	Singapore Technologies Engineering
SGX: Y92	Thai Beverages
SGX: U11	United Overseas Bank
SGX: U14	UOL Group
SGX: V03	Venture Corporation
SGX: F34	Wilmar International
SGX: BS6	Yangzijiang Shipbuilding Holdings
