= Independent water and power plant =

Power station which produces electricity and purified water

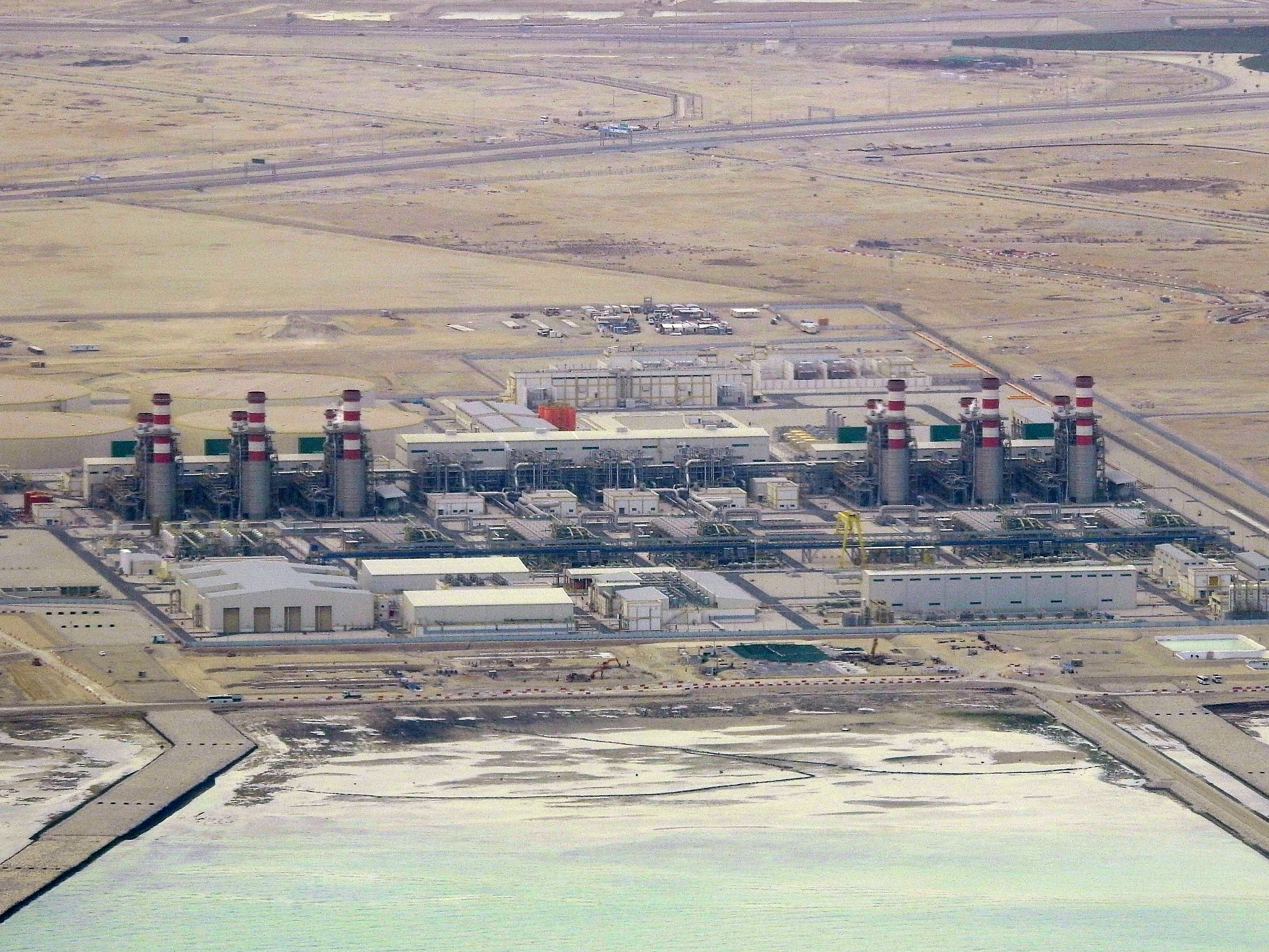
The Um Al Houl IWPP in Qatar.

An independent water and power plant (IWPP) or an integrated water and power project is a combined facility which serves as both a desalination plant and a power plant. IWPPs are more common in the Middle East, where demand for both electricity and salt water desalinisation are high.

Independent water and power producers negotiate both a feed-in power tariff and a water tariff in the same deal with the utility company, who also purchases both products. IWPPs tend to have an installed capacity of over 1 gigawatt (1,000 megawatts) and generates power in a typical thermal power station setup. Seawater is purified by integrating MSF, MED, TVC, or RO water desalination technologies with the power plant, thus increasing overall efficiency.

== See also ==
- Independent Power Producer
