= Mexico =

Country in North America

United Mexican States Estados Unidos Mexicanos (Spanish)
- Flag Coat of arms
- Anthem: Himno Nacional Mexicano "Mexican National Anthem"
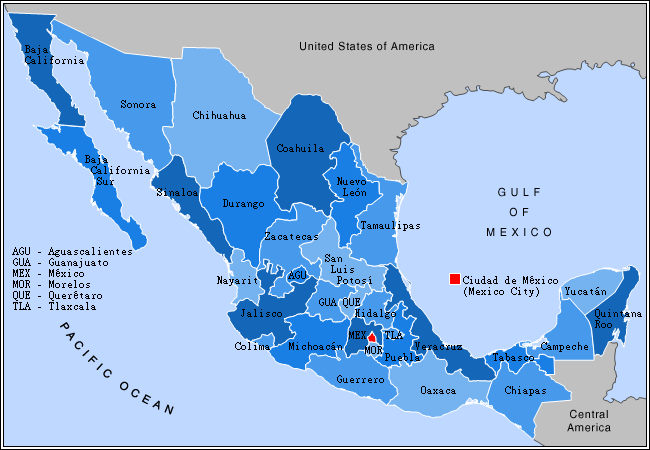
- Capital and largest city: Mexico City; 19°26′N 99°8′W
- Official language: Spanish (Note: Spanish is the de facto official language in the Mexican federal government.)
- Co-official languages: 68 Indigenous languages (Note: Article 4 of the General Law of Linguistic Rights of the Indigenous Peoples)
- Ethnic groups: See below
- Religion (2020): 88.9% Christianity; 77.7% Catholicism; 11.2% other Christian; 8.1% no religion; 2.4% others; 0.5% unanswered
- Demonym: Mexican
- Government: Federal presidential republic
  - President: Claudia Sheinbaum
  - President of the Senate: Higinio Martínez
  - President of the Chamber of Deputies: Raúl Bolaños Cacho Cué
  - Chief Justice: Hugo Aguilar Ortiz
- Legislature: Congress
  - Upper house: Senate
  - Lower house: Chamber of Deputies

Independence from Spain
  - Start of War of Independence: 16 September 1810
  - Declared: 27 September 1821
  - Recognized: 28 December 1836
  - First constitution: 4 October 1824
  - Second constitution: 5 February 1857
  - Current constitution: 5 February 1917

Area
  - Total: 1,972,550 km^{2} (761,610 sq mi) (13th)
  - Water (%): 1.58 (as of 2015)

Population
  - 2025 estimate: ▲130,911,314 (10th)
  - 2020 census: 126,014,024
  - Density: 61/km^{2} (158.0/sq mi) (142nd)
- GDP (PPP): 2026 estimate
  - Total: ▲$3.594 trillion (13th)
  - Per capita: ▲$26,743 (77th)
- GDP (nominal): 2026 estimate
  - Total: ▲$2.176 trillion (13th)
  - Per capita: ▲$16,191 (75th)
- Gini (2024): ▼39.1 medium inequality
- HDI (2023): ▲0.789 high (81st)
- Currency: Mexican peso (MXN)
- Time zone: UTC-8 to -5 (See Time in Mexico)
  - Summer (DST): UTC−7 to -5 (varies)
- Date format: dd/mm/yyyy
- Calling code: +52
- ISO 3166 code: MX
- Internet TLD: .mx

Mexico, (Note: Spanish: México or Méjico, pronunciation: [ˈmexiko]; Nahuatl: Mēxihko, pronunciation: [mɛːˈʃihkoˀ]; Yucatec Maya: Meejiko) (Note: Usually, in Spanish, the name of the country is spelled México; however, in Peninsular (European) Spanish, the variant Méjico is used alongside the usual version. According to the Diccionario panhispánico de dudas by the Royal Spanish Academy and Association of Academies of the Spanish Language, the version with J is also correct; however, the spelling with X is recommended, as it is the one used in Mexico.) officially the United Mexican States, (Note: Spanish: Estados Unidos Mexicanos ([esˈtaðos uˈniðos mexiˈkanos]); Nahuatl: Mexika Sentik Wexteyowalko, lit. 'Mexican United States'; Yucatec Maya: U Múuchꞌ Péetluꞌumiloꞌob México, lit. 'United States of Mexico') is a country in North America. It is the northernmost country in Latin America, bordering the United States of America to the north and Guatemala and Belize to the southeast, while having maritime boundaries with the Pacific Ocean to the west, the Caribbean Sea to the southeast, and the Gulf of Mexico to the east. Mexico covers 1,972,550 km^{2} (761,610 sq mi), and is the thirteenth-largest country in the world by land area. With a population around 131 million as of 2025, Mexico is the tenth-most populous country in the world and is home to the largest number of native Spanish speakers. Mexico City is the capital and largest city in Mexico, which ranks among the most populous metropolitan areas in the world.

Human presence in Mexico dates back to at least 11,500 BC, although dates as old as 28,000 BC have been proposed for less securely dated sites. Mesoamerica, considered a cradle of civilization, was home to numerous advanced societies, including the Olmecs, Maya, Zapotecs, Teotihuacan civilization, and Purépecha. Spanish colonization began in 1521 with an indigenous alliance that defeated the Aztec Empire, establishing the colony of New Spain with its capital at Tenochtitlan, now Mexico City. New Spain became a major center of the transoceanic economy during the Age of Discovery, fueled by silver mining and its position as a hub between Europe and Asia. This gave rise to one of the largest multiracial populations in the world. The Peninsular War led to the 1810–1821 Mexican War of Independence, which ended Peninsular rule and led to the creation of the First Mexican Empire, which quickly collapsed into the short-lived First Mexican Republic. In 1848, Mexico lost nearly half its territory in the Mexican–American War. Liberal reforms set in the Constitution of 1857 led to civil war and French intervention, culminating in the establishment of the Second Mexican Empire under Emperor Maximilian I of Habsburg, who was overthrown by Republican forces led by Benito Juárez. The late 19th century saw the long dictatorship of Porfirio Díaz, whose modernization policies came at the cost of severe social unrest. The 1910–1920 Mexican Revolution led to the overthrow of Díaz and the adoption of the 1917 Constitution. Mexico experienced rapid industrialization and economic growth in the 1940s–1970s, amidst electoral fraud, the Tlatelolco massacre, and economic crises. The late 20th century saw a shift towards neoliberalism, marked by the signing of the North American Free Trade Agreement (NAFTA) in 1994, amidst unrest in Chiapas.

Mexico is a federal republic with a presidential system of government, characterized by a democratic framework and the separation of powers into three branches: executive, legislative, and judicial. The federal legislature consists of the bicameral Congress of the Union, comprising the Chamber of Deputies, which represents the population, and the Senate, which provides equal representation for each state. The Constitution establishes three levels of government: the federal Union, the state governments, and the municipal governments. Mexico's federal structure grants autonomy to its 32 states, and its political system is deeply influenced by indigenous traditions and European Enlightenment ideals.

Mexico is a newly industrialized and developing country, with the world's 13th-largest economy by nominal GDP and the 13th-largest by purchasing power parity (PPP). It ranks first in the Americas and seventh in the world by the number of UNESCO World Heritage Sites. It is one of the world's 17 megadiverse countries, ranking fifth in natural biodiversity. It is a major tourist destination: as of 2022, it is the sixth most-visited country in the world, with 42.2 million international arrivals. Mexico's large economy and population, global cultural influence, and steady democratization make it a regional and middle power, increasingly identifying as an emerging power. As with much of Latin America, poverty, systemic corruption, and crime remain widespread. Since 2006, approximately 127,000 deaths have been caused by ongoing conflict between drug trafficking syndicates.

Mexico is a member of United Nations, the G20, the Organisation for Economic Co-operation and Development (OECD), the Coffee Club, the World Trade Organization (WTO), the Asia-Pacific Economic Cooperation (APEC) forum, the Organization of American States (OAS), the Community of Latin American and Caribbean States (CELAC), the Organization of Ibero-American States (OEI), and has an observer status at the Council of Europe.

== Etymology ==
The precise origin of the name is unknown and is heavily debated. Mēxihko is the Nahuatl term for the heartland of the Aztec Empire, namely the Valley of Mexico and surrounding territories, with its people being known as the Mexica. It is generally believed that the toponym for the valley was the origin of the primary ethnonym for the Aztec Triple Alliance, but it may have been the other way around. In the colonial era (1521–1821) when Mexico was known as New Spain, this central region became the Intendency of Mexico. After New Spain achieved independence from the Spanish Empire in 1821 and became a sovereign state, the Intendency came to be known as the State of Mexico, with the new country being named after its capital, Mexico City.

The country's official name has changed as the form of government has changed. The declaration of independence signed on 6 November 1813 by the deputies of the Congress of Anáhuac called the territory América Septentrional (Northern America). The 1821 Plan of Iguala also used América Septentrional. On two occasions (1821–1823 and 1863–1867), the country was known as Imperio Mexicano the Mexican Empire). All three federal constitutions (1824, 1857, and 1917, the current constitution) used the name Estados Unidos Mexicanos—or the variant Estados-Unidos Mexicanos, all of which have been translated as "United Mexican States".

The phrase República Mexicana, "Mexican Republic", was used in the 1836 Constitutional Laws. In the Nahuatl version of the current constitution, the official name is Mexika Sentik Wexteyowalko, and in its Yucatec Maya version, U Múuchꞌ Péetluꞌumiloꞌob México. By virtue of the legal equality of Spanish with the 68 indigenous languages of the country, all have their own translation of the official name.

== History ==
=== Indigenous civilizations before European contact (pre-1519) ===
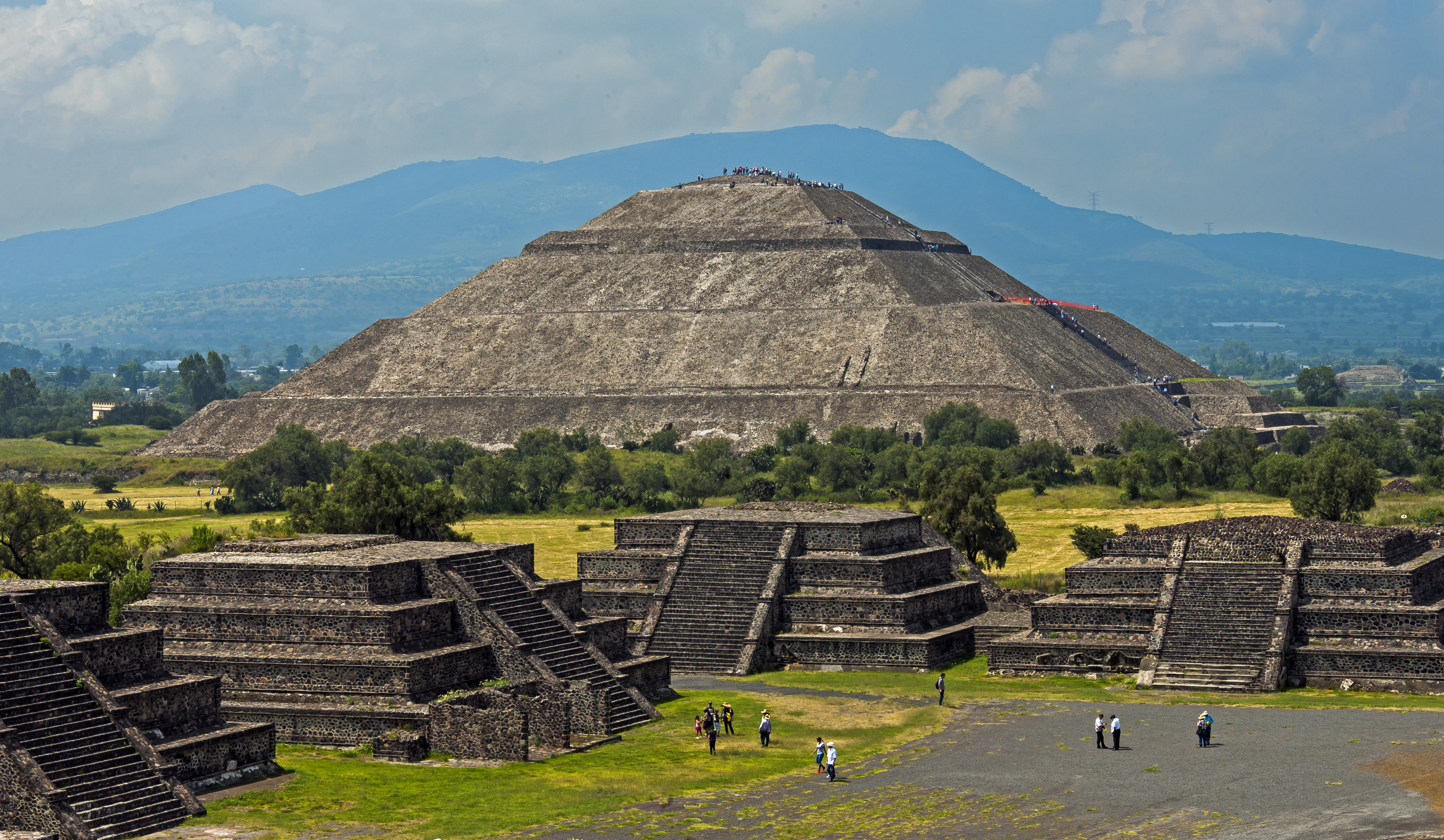
Teotihuacan was the 6th largest city in the world at its peak, 1 AD to 500 AD

The Temple of Kukulcán (El Castillo) in the Maya city of Chichen Itza

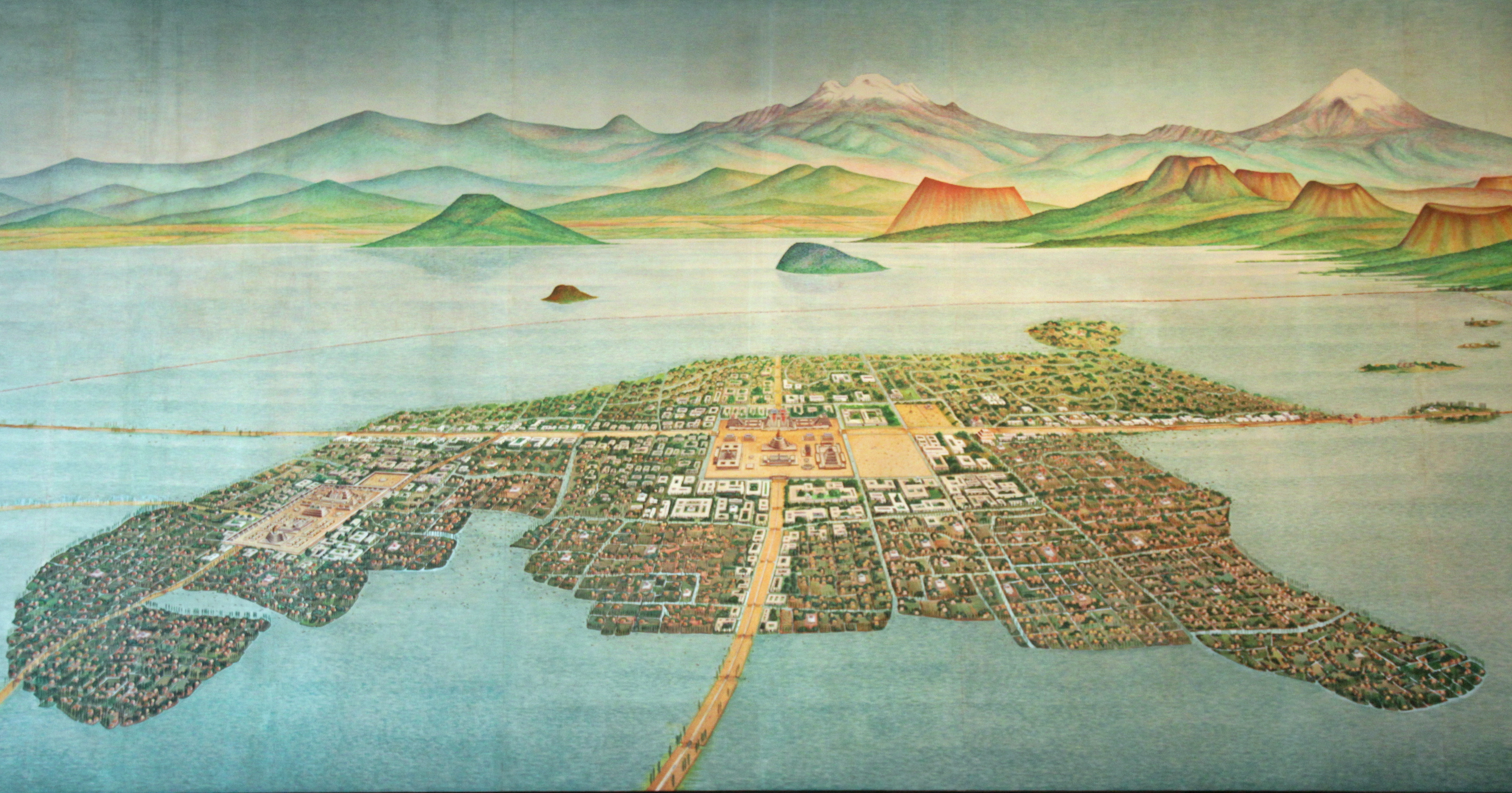
An artistic depiction of Mexico-Tenochtitlan, the Aztec capital and largest city in the Americas at the time. The city was completely destroyed in the 1521 siege of Tenochtitlan and rebuilt as Mexico City

The earliest human artifacts in what is now Mexico are chips of stone tools found in the Valley of Mexico, dated to circa 10,000 years ago. Mexico is the site of the domestication of maize, tomato, and beans, which produced an agricultural surplus. This enabled the transition from paleo-Indian hunter-gatherers to sedentary agricultural villages beginning around 5000 BC. The formative period of Mesoamerica is one of the six independent cradles of civilization, this era saw the origin of distinct cultural traits such as religious and symbolic traditions, maize cultivation, artistic and architectural complexes as well as a vigesimal (base 20) numeric system that spread from Mexican cultures to the rest of Mesoamerica. Villages became more densely populated, socially stratified with an artisan class, and developed into chiefdoms. The most powerful rulers had religious and political power, organizing the construction of ceremonial centers.

The earliest complex civilization was the Olmec culture, which flourished on the Gulf Coast from around 1500 BC. Olmec cultural traits diffused through Mexico into other formative-era cultures in Chiapas, Oaxaca, and the Valley of Mexico. In the pre-classical period, the Maya and Zapotec civilizations developed complex centers. The first true Mesoamerican writing systems were developed in the Epi-Olmec and Zapotec cultures. The Mesoamerican writing tradition reached its height in the Classic Maya Hieroglyphic script, the earliest written histories date from then. The tradition of writing was important after Spanish conquest in 1521, with indigenous scribes learning to write their languages in alphabetic letters, while continuing to create pictorial texts.

In Central Mexico, the height of the classic period saw the ascendancy of Teotihuacán, which formed a military and commercial empire. Teotihuacan, with a population of more than 150,000, had some of the largest pyramidal structures in the pre-Columbian Americas. After the collapse of Teotihuacán around 600 AD, competition ensued between political centers in such as Xochicalco and Cholula. During the Epi-Classic, Nahua peoples began moving south into Mesoamerica, and became politically and culturally dominant in central Mexico. During 1000–1519 AD, central Mexico was dominated by the Toltec culture, Oaxaca by the Mixtec, and the lowland Maya area had centers at Chichén Itzá and Mayapán. Toward the end of the post-Classic period, the Aztecs established dominance, establishing a political and economic empire based in Tenochtitlan (modern Mexico City), extending from central Mexico to Guatemala.

=== Spanish conquest and colonial era (1519–1821) ===
Although the Spanish Empire established colonies in the Caribbean in 1493, it first learned of Mexico during the Juan de Grijalva expedition of 1518. The Spanish conquest of the Aztec Empire began in 1519 when Hernán Cortés founded Veracruz. The 1521 capture of Tenochtitlan and posterior founding of Mexico City on its ruins, was the beginning of a 300-year colonial era, during which Mexico was known as Nueva España (New Spain). Two factors made Mexico a jewel in the Empire: the existence of large, hierarchically organized Mesoamerican populations that rendered tribute and performed obligatory labor, and discovery of silver deposits in north Mexico.

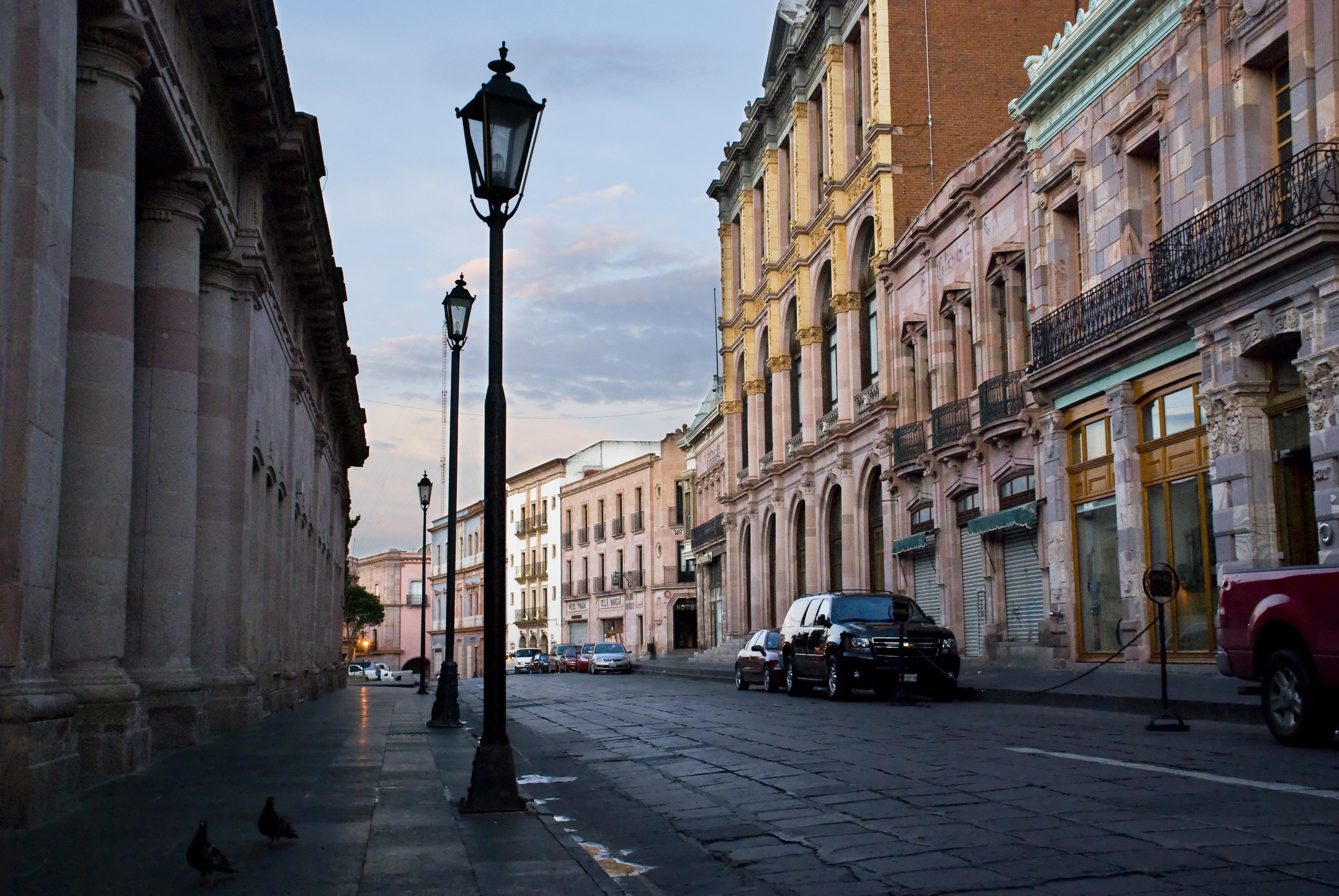
Zacatecas was one of the most opulent cities in New Spain.

The Kingdom of New Spain was created from the remnants of the Aztec empire. The two pillars of Spanish rule were the State and Church, both under the authority of the Spanish crown. In 1493 the pope granted sweeping powers to the Spanish monarchy for its overseas empire, with the proviso it spread Christianity. In 1524, King Charles I created the Council of the Indies based in Spain to oversee State power in its colonies. The crown established a high court in Mexico City, the Real Audiencia ('royal audience').

In 1535, the crown appointed the first Viceroy of New Spain, the highest official of the State. The Diocese of Mexico, created in 1530, was elevated to the Archdiocese of Mexico in 1546, with an archbishop as its head. Castilian Spanish was the language of the rulers. Catholic faith was the only one permitted, with non-Catholics and Catholics, excluding Indians, holding unorthodox views subject to the Mexican Inquisition.

Spanish military forces, sometimes accompanied by native allies, led expeditions to conquer territory or quell rebellions. Notable Amerindian revolts include the Chichimeca War (1576–1606), the Tepehuán Revolt (1616–20), and Pueblo Revolt (1680). Most rebellions were small-scale, posing no major threat to the elites. To protect Mexico from the attacks of English, French, and Dutch pirates and the Crown's monopoly of revenue, only two ports were open to foreign trade—Veracruz on the Atlantic, connecting to Spain, and Acapulco on the Pacific, connecting to the Philippines. Pirate attacks included the 1663 Sack of Campeche and 1683 Attack on Veracruz.

Of greater concern to the crown was the issue of invasion, especially after Britain seized Havana and Manila in 1762, during the Seven Years' War. It created a standing military, increased coastal fortifications, and expanded the northern presidios and missions into Alta California. The volatility of the urban poor in Mexico City was evident in the 1692 riot over the price of maize. It escalated to a full-scale attack on the seats of power, with the viceregal palace and archbishop's residence attacked.

=== Independence era (1808–1855) ===
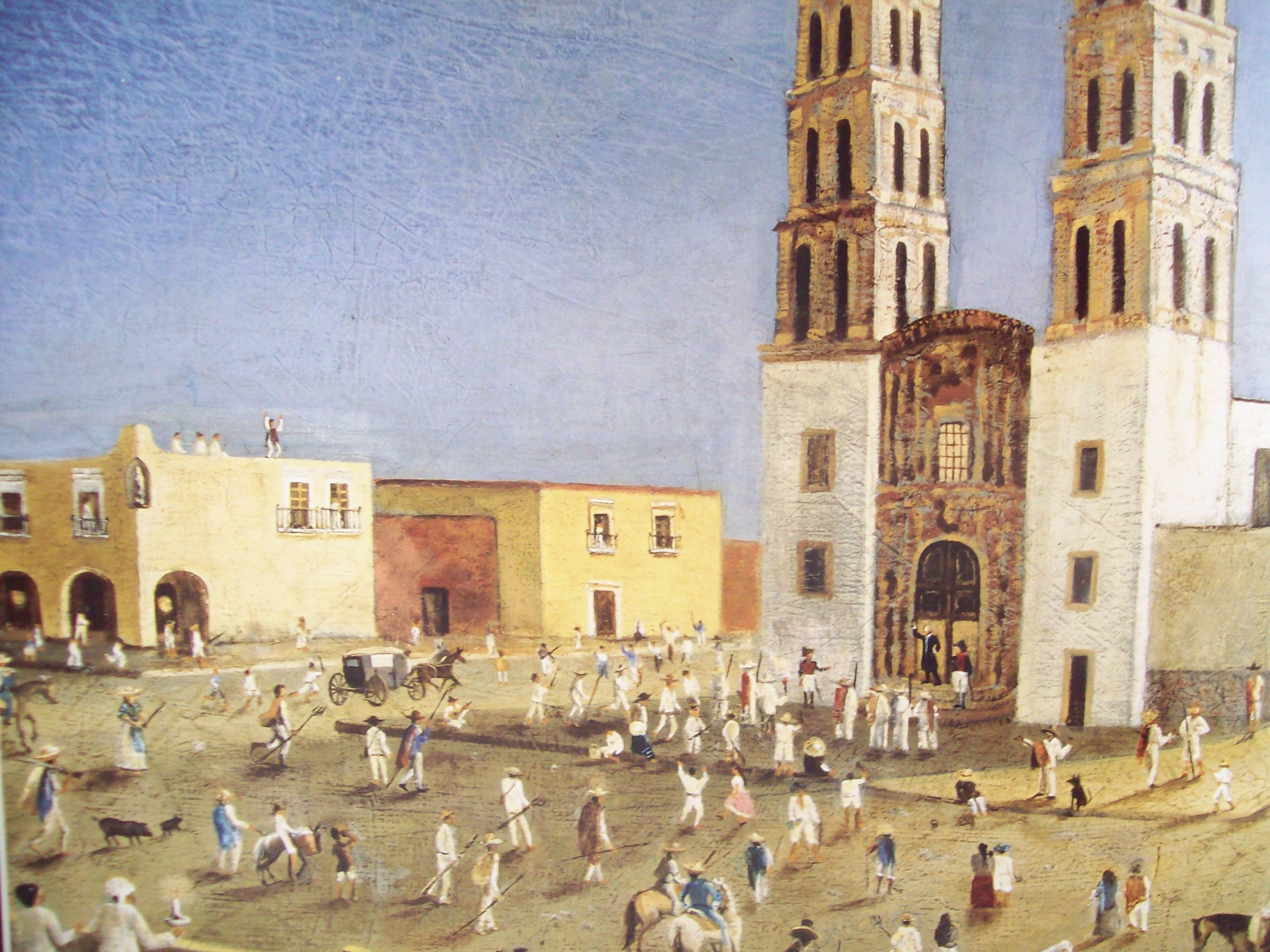
Miguel Hidalgo y Costilla's Cry of Dolores on 16 September 1810, by J.J. del Moral. The call to arms marks the beginning of Mexico's War of Independence against Spanish colonial rule

In 1810, secular priest Miguel Hidalgo y Costilla declared against "bad government" in Dolores, Guanajuato. Known as the Cry of Dolores (Spanish: Grito de Dolores) it is commemorated each year, on 16 September, as Mexico's independence day. The upheaval in the Empire, that resulted in the independence of most of its New World territories, was due to Napoleon's invasion of Spain in 1808. Hidalgo and some of his soldiers were executed by firing squad in 1811. The first 35 years after Mexico's independence were marked by instability and changing of the Mexican state from a transient monarchy to a fragile federated republic. There were military coups, foreign invasions, ideological conflict between Conservatives and Liberals, and economic stagnation.

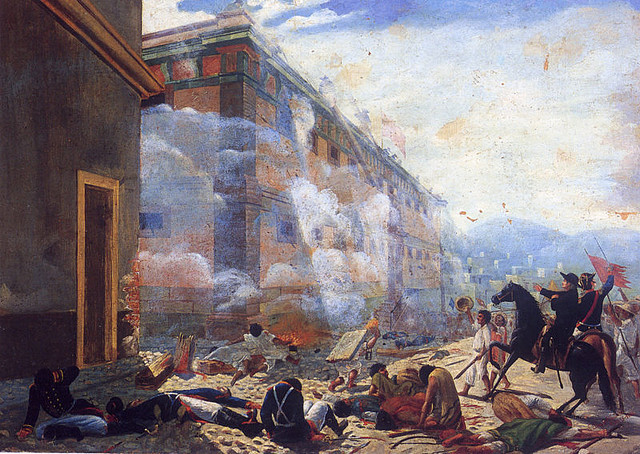
The capture of Alhóndiga de Granaditas in Guanajuato by Hidalgo's army on 28 September 1810, by José Díaz del Castillo

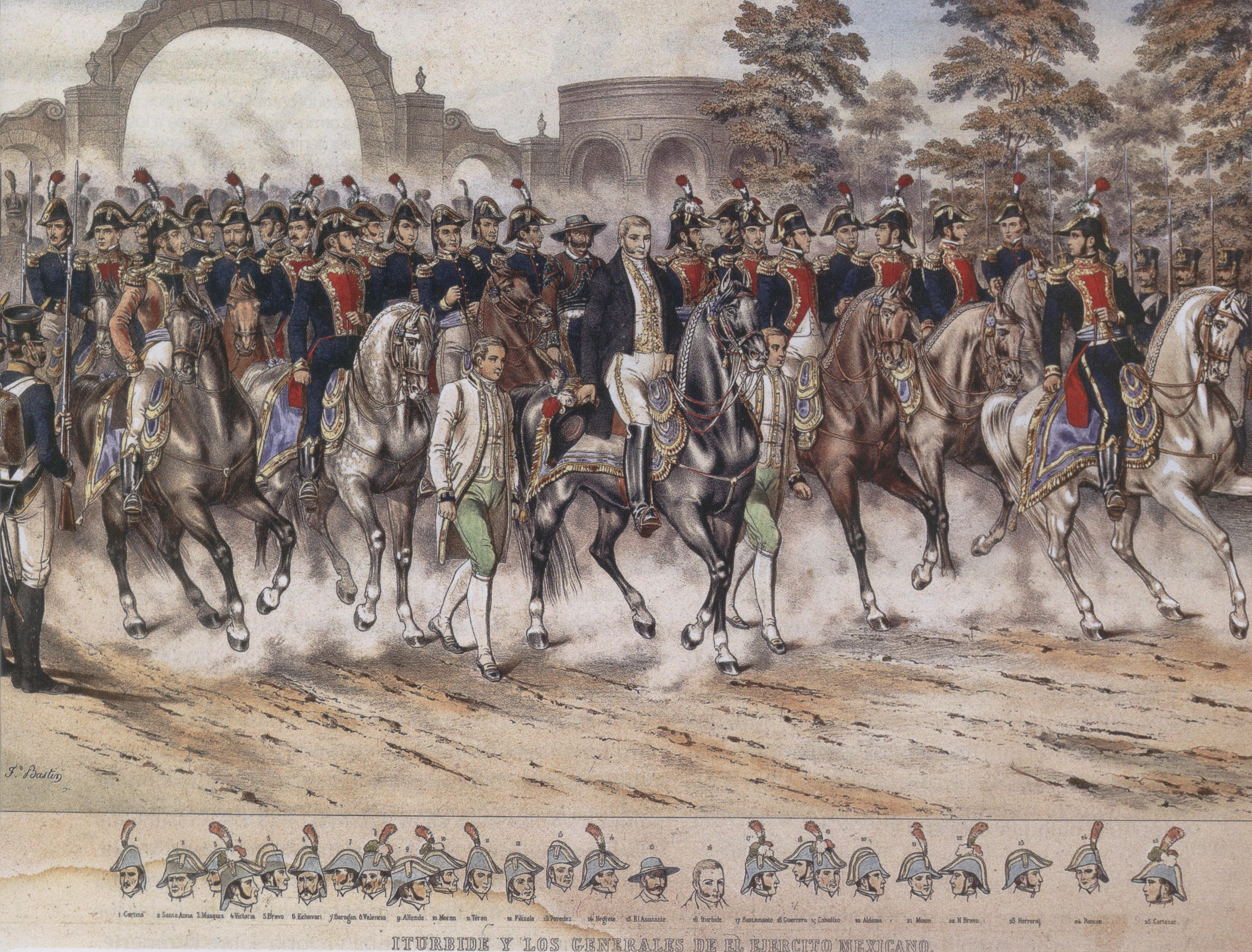
The entry of the Army of the Three Guarantees into Mexico City on 27 September 1821

Former Royal Army General Agustín de Iturbide became regent, as newly independent Mexico sought a constitutional monarch from Europe. When no member of a European royal house desired the position, Iturbide himself was declared Emperor Agustín I. The US was the first country to recognize Mexico's independence, sending a message to Europe via the Monroe Doctrine not to intervene in Mexico. The emperor's rule was short (1822–23), he was overthrown by army officers in the Plan of Casa Mata. Central America and Chiapas left the union to form the Federal Republic of Central America.

In 1824, the First Mexican Republic was established. Former insurgent General Guadalupe Victoria became the first president — the first of many generals to hold the presidency. In 1829, former insurgent general and fierce Liberal Vicente Guerrero, a signatory of the Plan of Iguala that achieved independence, became president in a disputed election. During his term, from April to December 1829, he abolished slavery. His Conservative vice president, former Royalist General Anastasio Bustamante, led a coup against him and Guerrero was judicially murdered.

Mexico's ability to maintain its independence and establish a viable government was in question. Spain attempted to reconquer it during the 1820s, but eventually recognized its independence. France attempted to recoup losses it claimed for its citizens during Mexico's unrest and blockaded the Gulf Coast during the Pastry War of 1838–39. General Antonio López de Santa Anna emerged as a national hero because of his role in these conflicts; Santa Anna came to dominate politics for the next 25 years, often known as the "Age of Santa Anna", until his overthrow in 1855.

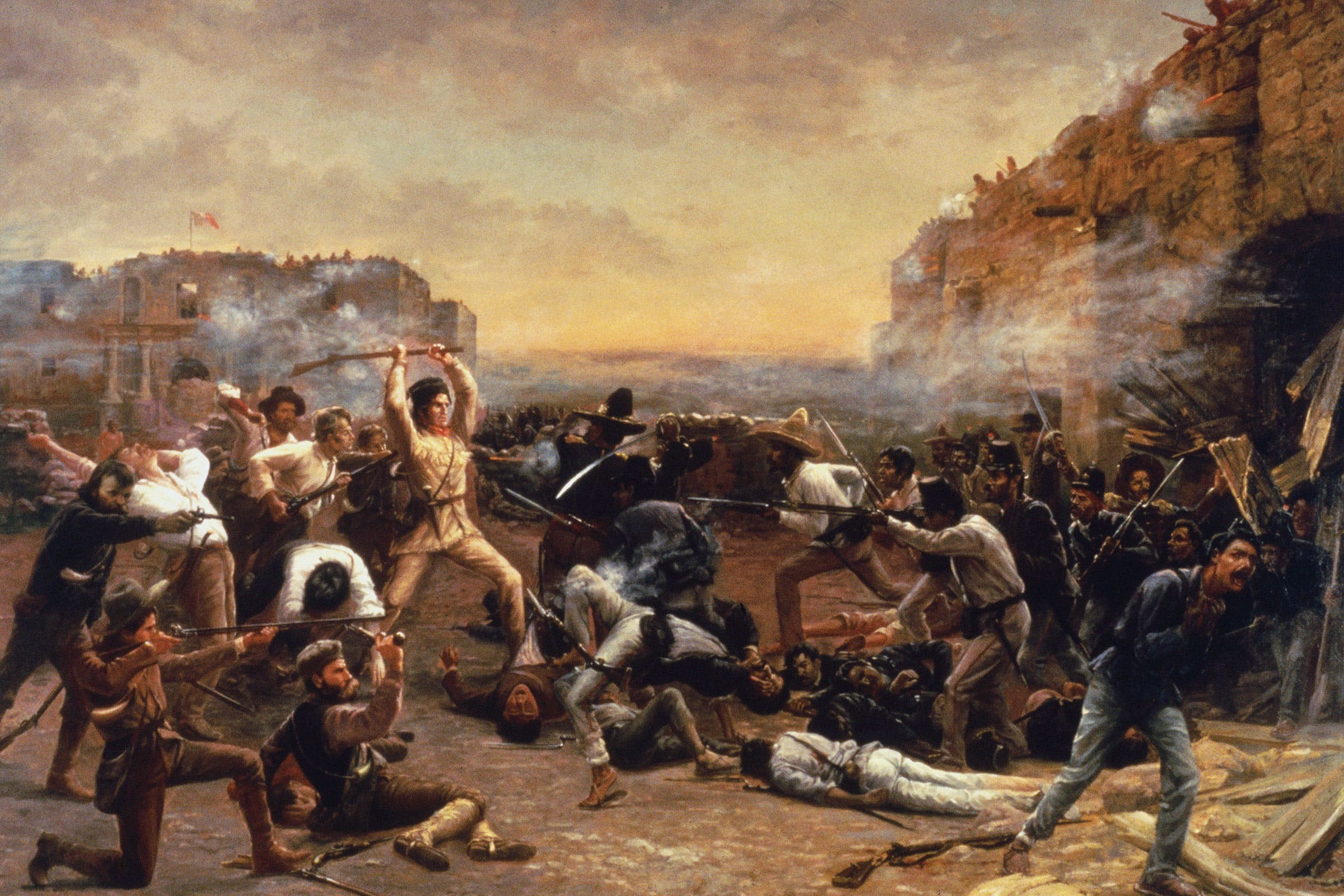
The 1836 Battle of El Álamo between the Mexican army led by President Antonio López de Santa Anna and American troops

Mexico contended with indigenous groups that controlled the territory that Mexico claimed in the north. For example, the Comanche controlled a huge territory in sparsely populated central and northern Texas. Wanting to stabilize and develop that area — and as few from central Mexico had chosen to resettle to this remote and hostile territory — the Mexican government encouraged Anglo-American immigration into present-day Texas, a region that bordered the US. Mexico by law was a Catholic country; the Anglo-Americans were primarily Protestant English speakers from the southern US. Some brought their black slaves, which after 1829 was contrary to Mexican law.

In 1835, Santa Anna sought to centralize government rule in Mexico, suspending the 1824 constitution and promulgating the Seven Laws, which placed power in his hands. As a result, civil war spread. Three new governments declared independence: the Republic of Texas, the Republic of the Rio Grande and the Republic of Yucatán. The largest blow to Mexico was the US invasion in 1846 in the Mexican–American War. Mexico lost much of its northern territory, sealed in the 1848 Treaty of Guadalupe Hidalgo. Despite this, Santa Anna returned to the presidency, but was ousted and exiled during the Liberal Revolution of Ayutla.

=== Liberal era (1855–1911) ===
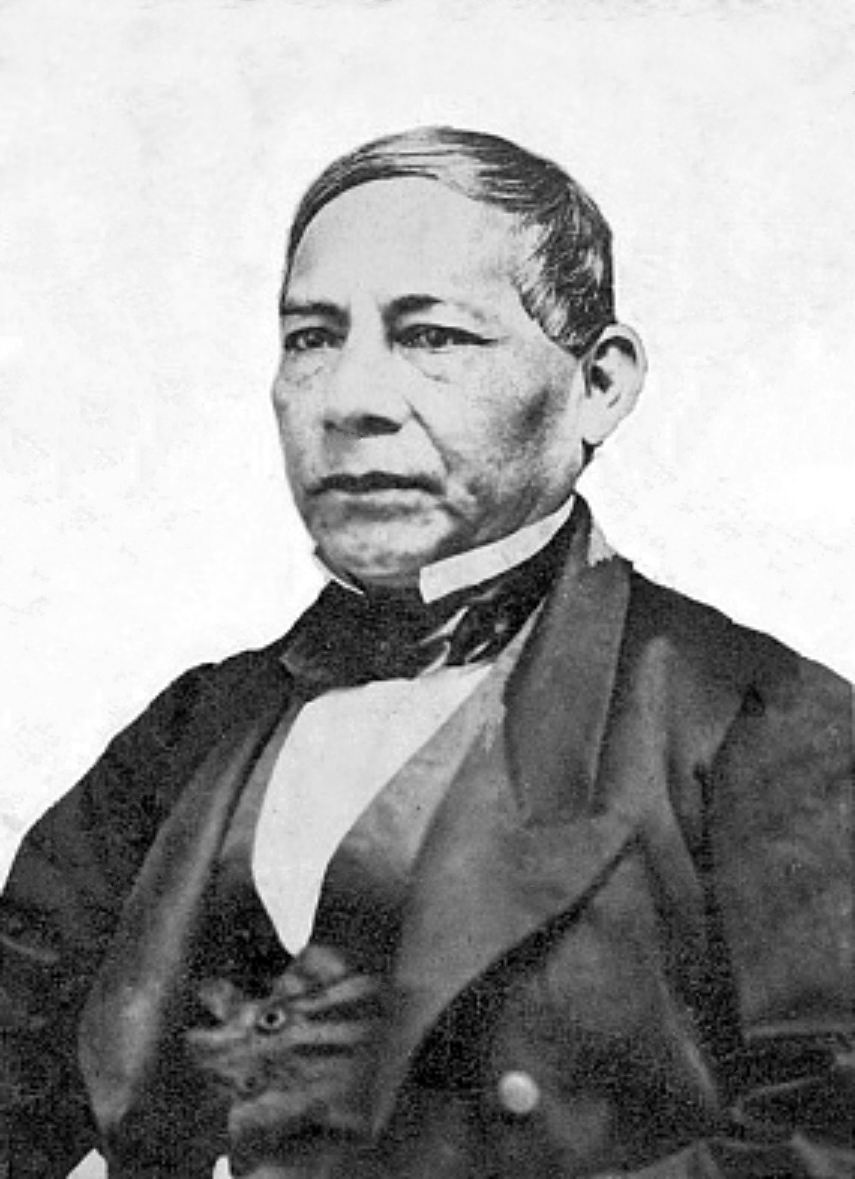
Liberal President Benito Juárez. Known for his efforts to modernize Mexico, defend its sovereignty, and promote liberal reforms, especially during the mid-19th century

The overthrow of Santa Anna, and establishment of a civilian government by liberals, allowed them to enact laws they considered vital for development. La Reforma attempted to modernize the economy and institutions along liberal principles. They promulgated a new Constitution of 1857, separating Church and State, stripping the Church and military of privileges (fueros); mandating the sale of Church-owned property and indigenous community lands, and secularizing education. Conservatives revolted, touching off the Reform War between Liberal and Conservative governments (1858–61).

The Liberals defeated the Conservative army on the battlefield, but Conservatives sought to gain power via intervention by the French, asking Emperor Napoleon III to place a European monarch as head of state in Mexico. The French Army defeated the Mexicans and placed Maximilian Habsburg on the newly established throne, supported by Mexican Conservatives. The Liberal Republic under Benito Juárez was a government in internal exile, but with the end of the American Civil War in 1865, the US government began aiding the Mexican Republic. The French Army withdrew its support, but Maximilian remained in Mexico; Republican forces executed him. The "Restored Republic" saw the return of Juárez, "the personification of the embattled republic," as president.

The Conservatives had been defeated militarily and discredited politically, for their collaboration with the French, and liberalism became synonymous with patriotism. The Mexican Army, which originated in the colonial royalist forces and transitioned into the early Republic military, was effectively destroyed following its defeat by Liberal forces in the Reform War and subsequently by the French intervention, enabling the emergence of a new generation of military leaders during the restoration of the Republic. Notable was Porfirio Díaz, a hero of the Cinco de Mayo, who sought civilian power and challenged Juárez on his re-election in 1867.

Díaz rebelled but was crushed by Juárez. Having won re-election, Juárez died in office in 1872. Liberal Sebastián Lerdo de Tejada became president, declaring a "religion of the state" for the rule of law, peace, and order. When Lerdo ran for re-election, Díaz rebelled against the civilian president, issuing the Plan of Tuxtepec. Díaz had more support and waged guerrilla war against Lerdo. On the verge of Díaz's victory on the battlefield, Lerdo fled from office into exile.

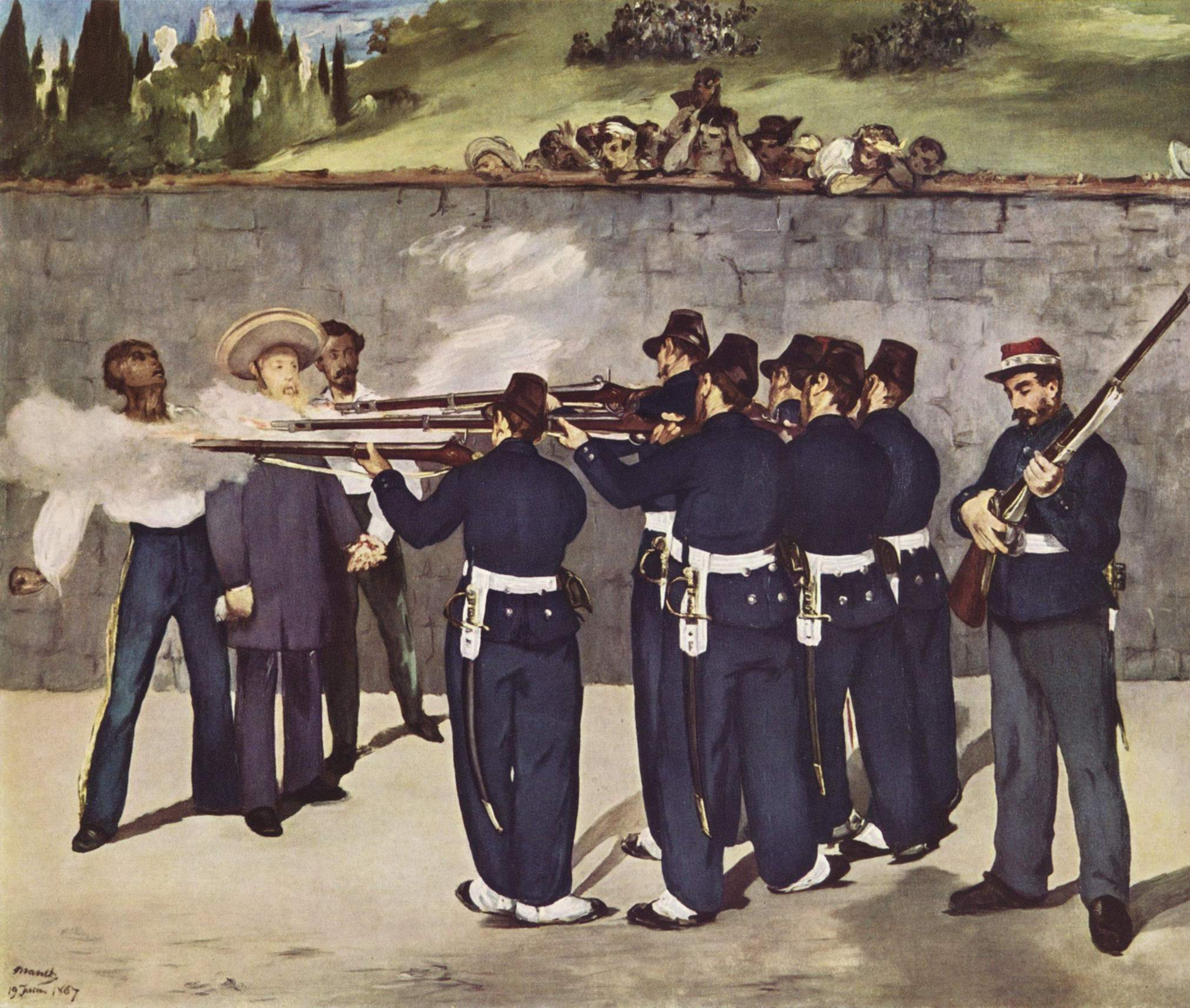
The Execution of Emperor Maximilian, June 1867. Gen. Tomás Mejía, left; Maximiian, center; Gen. Miguel Miramón, right. Painting by Édouard Manet 1868

After the turmoil of 1810 to 1876, the 35-year rule of Liberal General Porfirio Díaz (1876–1911) allowed Mexico to modernize in a period described one of "order and progress". The Porfiriato was characterized by economic stability and growth, foreign investment and influence, an expansion of the rail network and telecommunications, and investments in the arts and sciences. Díaz ruled with a group of advisors that became known as the científicos ('scientists'). The regime was influenced by positivism. They rejected theology and idealism in favor of scientific methods applied towards development.

An integral aspect was secular education. The Díaz government led a protracted conflict against the Yaqui that culminated with the forced relocation of Yaqui to Yucatán and Oaxaca. Díaz gave an interview where he said he was not going to run in the 1910 elections, when he would be 80. Opposition had been suppressed and there were few avenues for new leaders. His announcement set off a frenzy of activity, including the unlikely candidacy of the son of a rich landowning family, Francisco I. Madero. Madero won a surprising amount of support when Díaz changed his mind and ran in the election, jailing Madero.

=== Mexican Revolution (1910–1920) ===
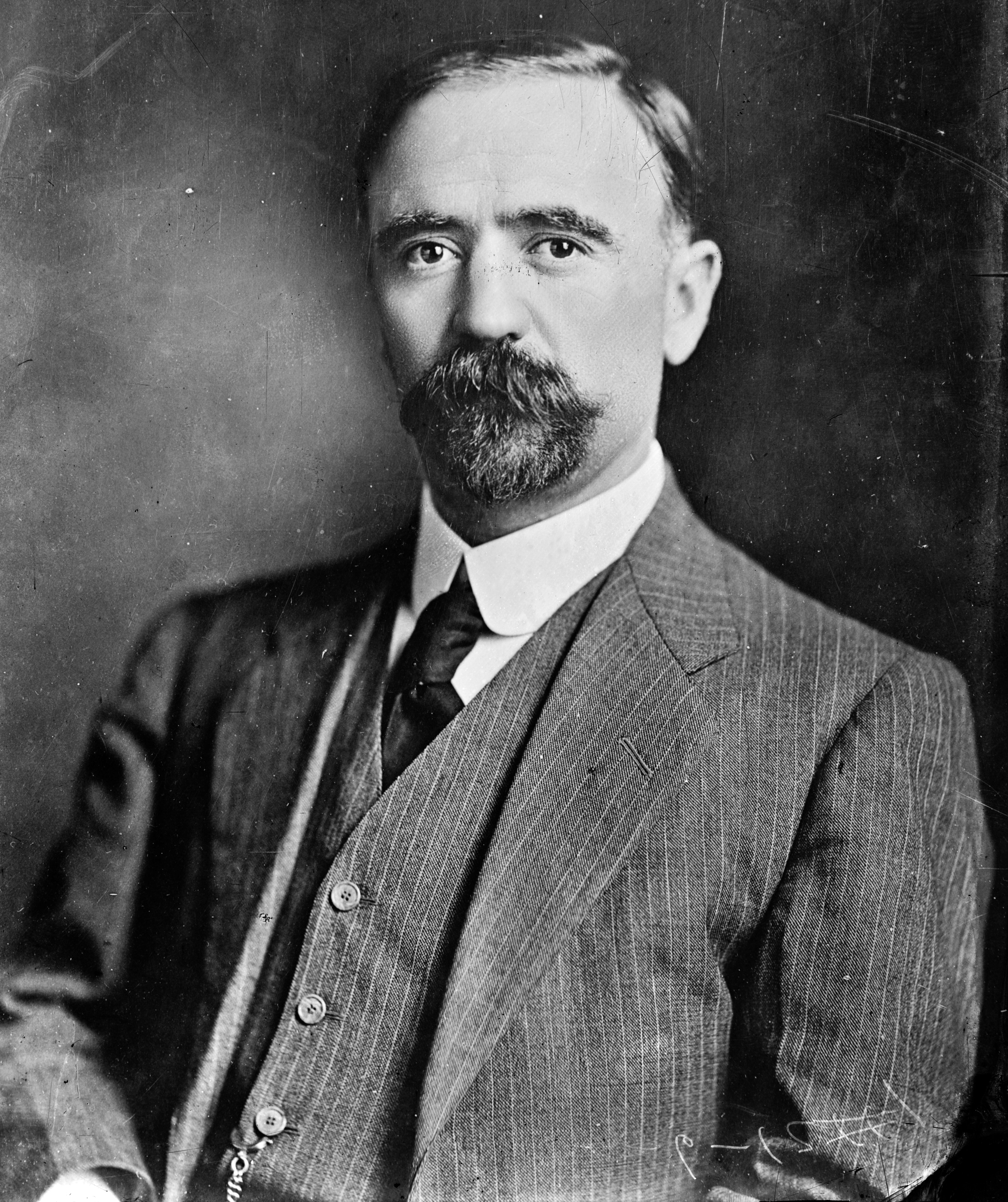
Francisco I. Madero, who challenged Díaz in the fraudulent 1910 election and was elected president when Díaz was forced to resign in May 1911

The Mexican Revolution was a decade-long transformational conflict, the "wind that swept Mexico." It began with uprisings against Díaz after the fraudulent 1910 election, his resignation in May 1911, demobilization of rebel forces, an interim presidency and the democratic election of Madero in fall 1911. In February 1913, a military coup overthrew Madero's government, with the support of the US, resulting in Madero's murder by agents of Federal Army General Victoriano Huerta. The US administration of Taft supported the Huerta coup, but when Democrat Woodrow Wilson was inaugurated as president in March 1913, Wilson refused to recognize Huerta's regime and allowed arms sales to the Constitutionalists. Wilson ordered troops to occupy the strategic port of Veracruz in 1914. A coalition of anti-Huerta forces in the North, the Constitutional Army led by Governor of Coahuila Venustiano Carranza, and a peasant army in the South under Emiliano Zapata defeated the Federal Army in 1914, leaving only revolutionary forces.

Following the revolutionaries' victory against Huerta, they sought to broker a political solution, but the coalition splintered, plunging Mexico again into civil war. Constitutionalist general Pancho Villa broke with Carranza and allied with Zapata. Carranza's best general Alvaro Obregón defeated Villa, his former comrade, in the Battle of Celaya in 1915, and Villa's forces melted away. Carranza became president, and the US recognized his government while Zapata's forces in the south reverted to guerrilla war.

After Villa was defeated by revolutionary forces in 1915, he led an incursion raid into Columbus, New Mexico, prompting the US to send 10,000 troops in an unsuccessful attempt to capture Villa. Carranza pushed back against US troops being in northern Mexico. The expeditionary forces withdrew as the US entered World War I. Although often viewed as internal, the revolution had international elements: Germany attempted to get Mexico to side with it, sending a coded telegram in 1917 to incite war between the US and Mexico, with Mexico to regain the territory it lost in the Mexican-American War but Mexico remained neutral in the conflict.

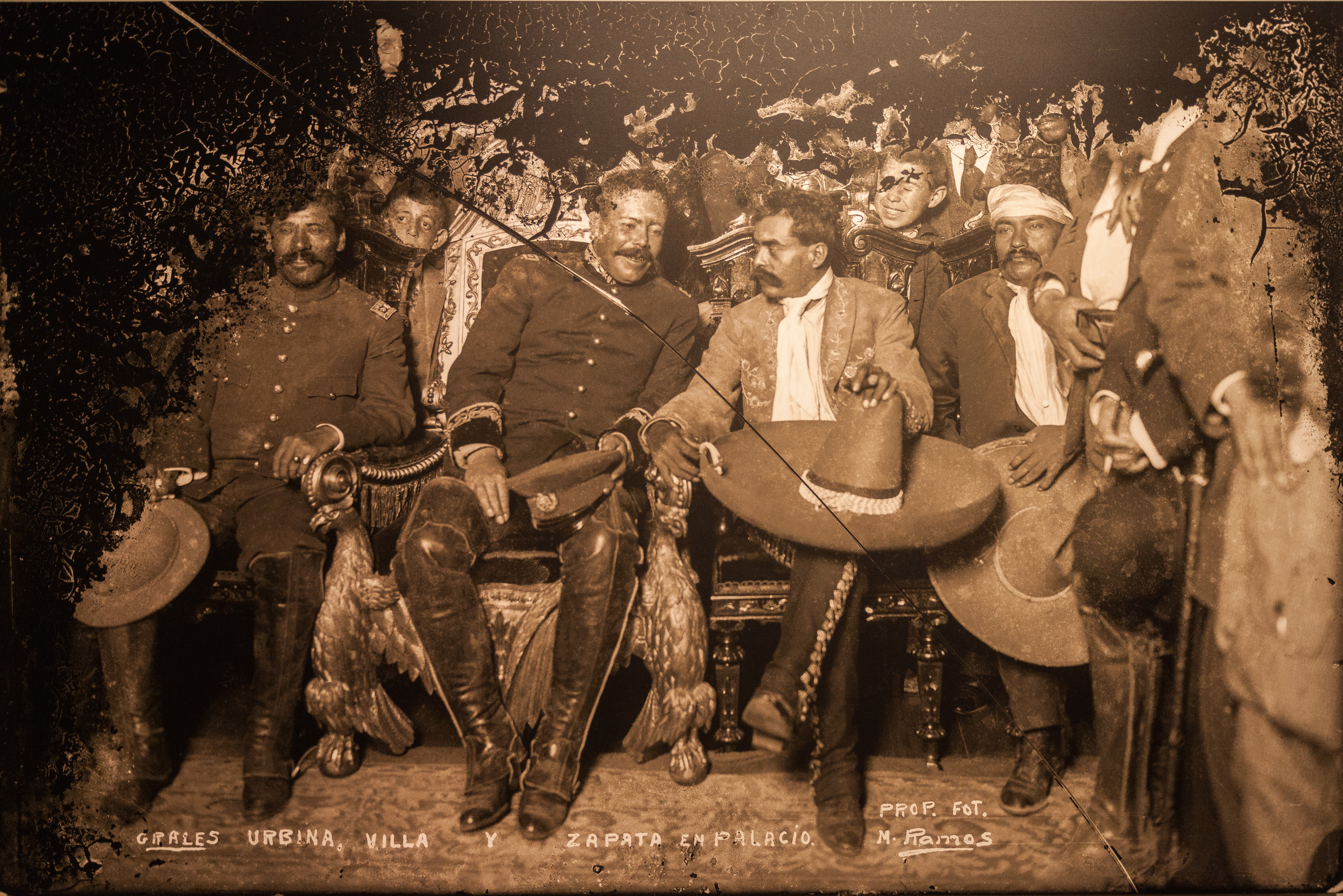
Tomás Urbina, Pancho Villa and Emiliano Zapata in the National Palace during the Mexican Revolution, 1914

In 1916, the winners of the Mexican Revolution met at a constitutional convention to draft the Constitution of 1917, ratified in February 1917. The Constitution empowered the government to expropriate resources including land, gave rights to labor, and strengthened anticlerical provisions. It remains the governing document of Mexico. The revolutionary war killed 900,000 out of Mexico's 15 million population. Consolidating power, Carranza had Zapata assassinated in 1919. Carranza had gained the support of the peasantry, but once in power, he did little to institute land reform, which had motivated many to fight. Carranza returned some confiscated land to their original owners. Carranza's best general, Obregón, served in his administration, but returned to his home state Sonora to position himself to run in the 1920 election. Since Carranza could not run for re-election, he chose a civilian to succeed him, intending to remain in power behind the presidency. Obregón and two other Sonoran revolutionary generals drew up the Plan of Agua Prieta, overthrowing Carranza. General Adolfo de la Huerta became interim president, followed by the election of General Álvaro Obregón.

=== Political consolidation and one-party rule (1920–2000) ===
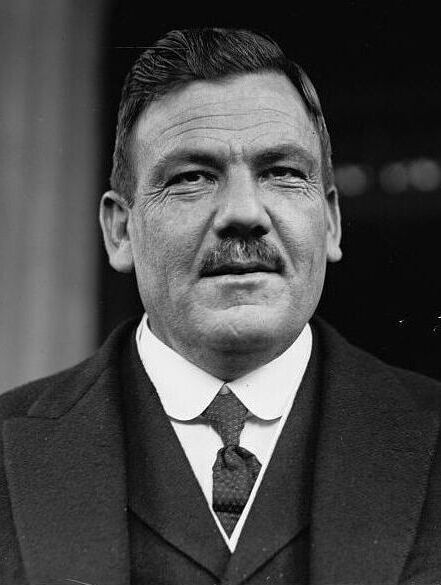
Plutarco Elías Calles, the ruler of the Maximato and the founder of the Institutional Revolutionary Party, that held uninterrupted power in Mexico from 1929 to 2000

The post-revolutionary period (1920–46) was characterized by revolutionary generals serving as presidents, including Álvaro Obregón (1920–24), Plutarco Elías Calles (1924–28), Lázaro Cárdenas (1934–40), and Manuel Avila Camacho (1940–46). The government sought to bring order, end military intervention in politics, and create organizations of interest groups. Workers, peasants, office workers, and even the army for a short period, were incorporated as sectors of the single party that dominated politics from its founding in 1929. Obregón instigated land reform and strengthened organized labor. He gained recognition from the US and settled claims with companies and individuals that lost property during the Revolution. He imposed his fellow revolutionary general, Calles, as his successor. Calles provoked a major conflict with the Catholic Church and Catholic guerrilla armies when he enforced anticlerical articles of the constitution, which ended with an agreement. Although the constitution prohibited the reelection of the president, Obregón wished to run again and the constitution was amended to allow non-consecutive re-election. He won the 1928 elections but was assassinated by a Catholic activist, causing a succession crisis. Calles could not become president again, so he sought to set up a structure to manage succession, founding the Institutional Revolutionary Party, which dominated Mexico for the rest of the 20th century.

Despite not holding the presidency, Calles remained the key politician during the period known as the Maximato (1929–34), that ended during the presidency of Lázaro Cárdenas, who expelled Calles and implemented economic and social reforms. This included the Mexican oil expropriation in 1938, which nationalized the U.S. and Anglo-Dutch oil company known as the Mexican Eagle Petroleum Company, which would result in the creation of the state-owned Pemex.

Cárdenas's successor, Manuel Ávila Camacho (1940–46) was moderate, and relations between the US and Mexico improved during World War II, when Mexico was a significant ally. From 1946 the election of Miguel Alemán, the first civilian president in the post-revolutionary period, Mexico embarked on a program of development, known as the Mexican miracle, characterized by industrialization, urbanization, and increased inequality between urban and rural areas. The Green Revolution, a technological movement that led to worldwide increases in crop production, began in the Yaqui Valley in the middle of the 20th century.

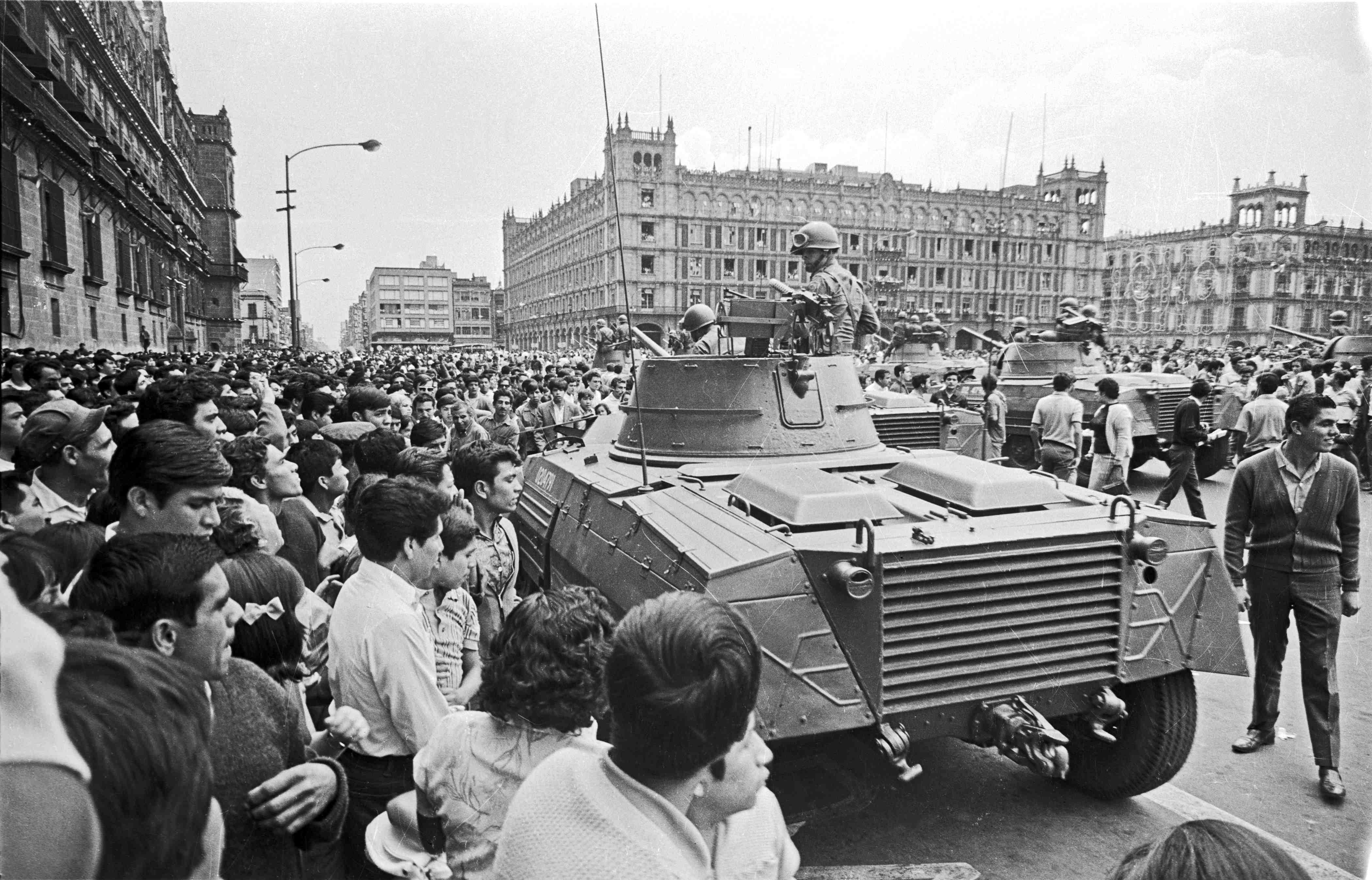
Armored cars in the Zócalo during the protests of 1968

With robust growth, Mexico sought to showcase itself by hosting the 1968 Summer Olympics. The government poured resources into new facilities, prompting unrest among students and others. Demonstrations in Mexico City went on for weeks before the opening of the games, with the government of Gustavo Díaz Ordaz cracking down. The culmination was the Tlatelolco Massacre, which killed 300–800 protesters. Although the economy continued to flourish for some, inequality remained a factor of discontent. PRI rule became authoritarian and oppressive in the Mexican Dirty War.

In the 1980s the first cracks emerged in the PRI's political dominance. In Baja California, the PAN candidate was elected governor. When De la Madrid chose Carlos Salinas de Gortari as the candidate for the PRI, and therefore a foregone presidential victor, Cuauhtémoc Cárdenas, son of former President Lázaro Cárdenas, broke with the PRI and challenged Salinas in the 1988 elections. In 1988 there was electoral fraud, with results showing that Salinas had won the election by the narrowest percentage ever. There were protests in Mexico City over the stolen election. Salinas took the oath of office in December 1988. In 1990 the PRI was described by Mario Vargas Llosa as the "perfect dictatorship", but there had been major challenges to the PRI's hegemony.

Salinas embarked on a program of neoliberal reforms that fixed the exchange rate, controlled inflation, opened Mexico to foreign investment, and began talks with the US and Canada to join their free-trade agreement, which culminated in the North American Free Trade Agreement (NAFTA) on 1 January 1994; the same day, the Zapatista Army of National Liberation (EZLN) in Chiapas began armed rebellion against the federal government, which captured towns and brought world attention. The armed conflict was short-lived and continues as a non-violent opposition movement against neoliberalism and globalization. In 1994, following the assassination of the PRI's presidential candidate Luis Donaldo Colosio, Salinas was succeeded by victorious PRI candidate Ernesto Zedillo. Salinas left Zedillo's government to deal with the Mexican peso crisis, requiring a $50 billion IMF bailout. Macroeconomic reforms were started by Zedillo, and the economy recovered and growth peaked at 7% by 1999.

=== Contemporary Mexico ===
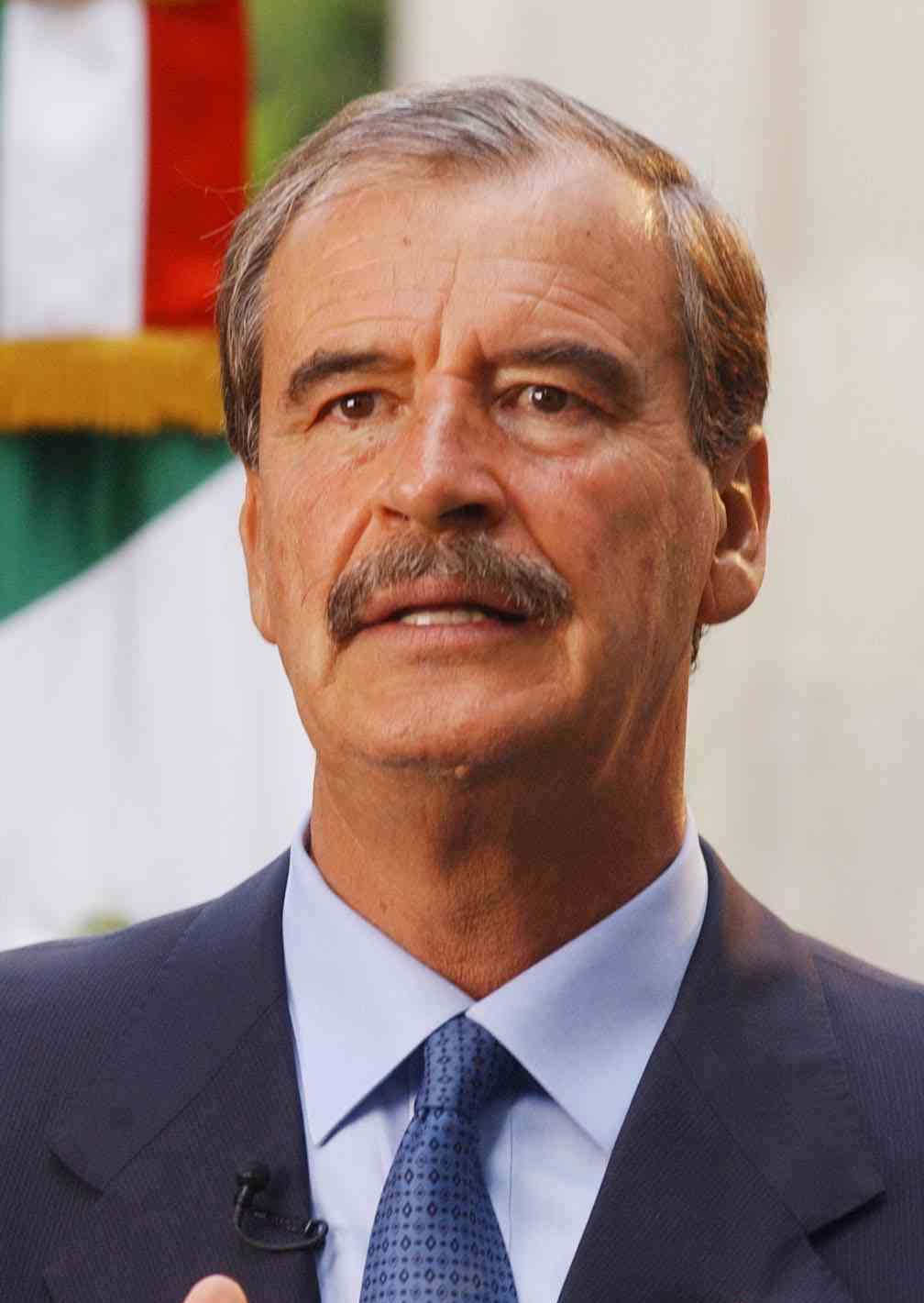
Vicente Fox won the 2000 general election and became the first president not from the PRI since 1929, and the first elected from an opposition party since Francisco I. Madero in 1911

After 71 years of rule, the incumbent PRI lost the 2000 presidential election to Vicente Fox of the opposing conservative National Action Party (PAN). In the 2006 presidential election, Felipe Calderón from the PAN was declared the winner, with a narrow margin (0.6%) over leftist politician Andrés Manuel López Obrador of the Party of the Democratic Revolution (PRD). López Obrador, however, contested the election and pledged to create an "alternative government". In the 2012 presidential election, the PRI again won the presidency with the election of Enrique Peña Nieto. However, he won with a plurality of around 38% and did not have a legislative majority.

During the 21st century, Mexico has contended with high crime rates, bureaucratic corruption, narcotrafficking, and a stagnant economy. Many state-owned enterprises were privatized starting in the 1990s with neoliberal reforms. Pemex, the state-owned petroleum company is being privatized, with exploration licenses being issued. In a push against corruption, the ex-CEO of Pemex, Emilio Lozoya Austin, was arrested in 2020.

After founding the new political party MORENA, Andrés Manuel López Obrador (known as AMLO) won the 2018 election with over 50%. His coalition, led by his left-wing party founded after the 2012 elections, included parties from across the spectrum. The coalition won a majority in the upper and lower Congress chambers. His success is attributed to opposing political forces exhausting their chances, as well as AMLO's adoption of moderate discourse focused on reconciliation. The first confirmed case of COVID-19 in Mexico occurred in February 2020, and COVID-19 vaccination in Mexico began in December. Claudia Sheinbaum, AMLO's successor, won the 2024 presidential election in a landslide and became the first woman to lead Mexico. She was sworn in on 1 October 2024.

== Geography ==
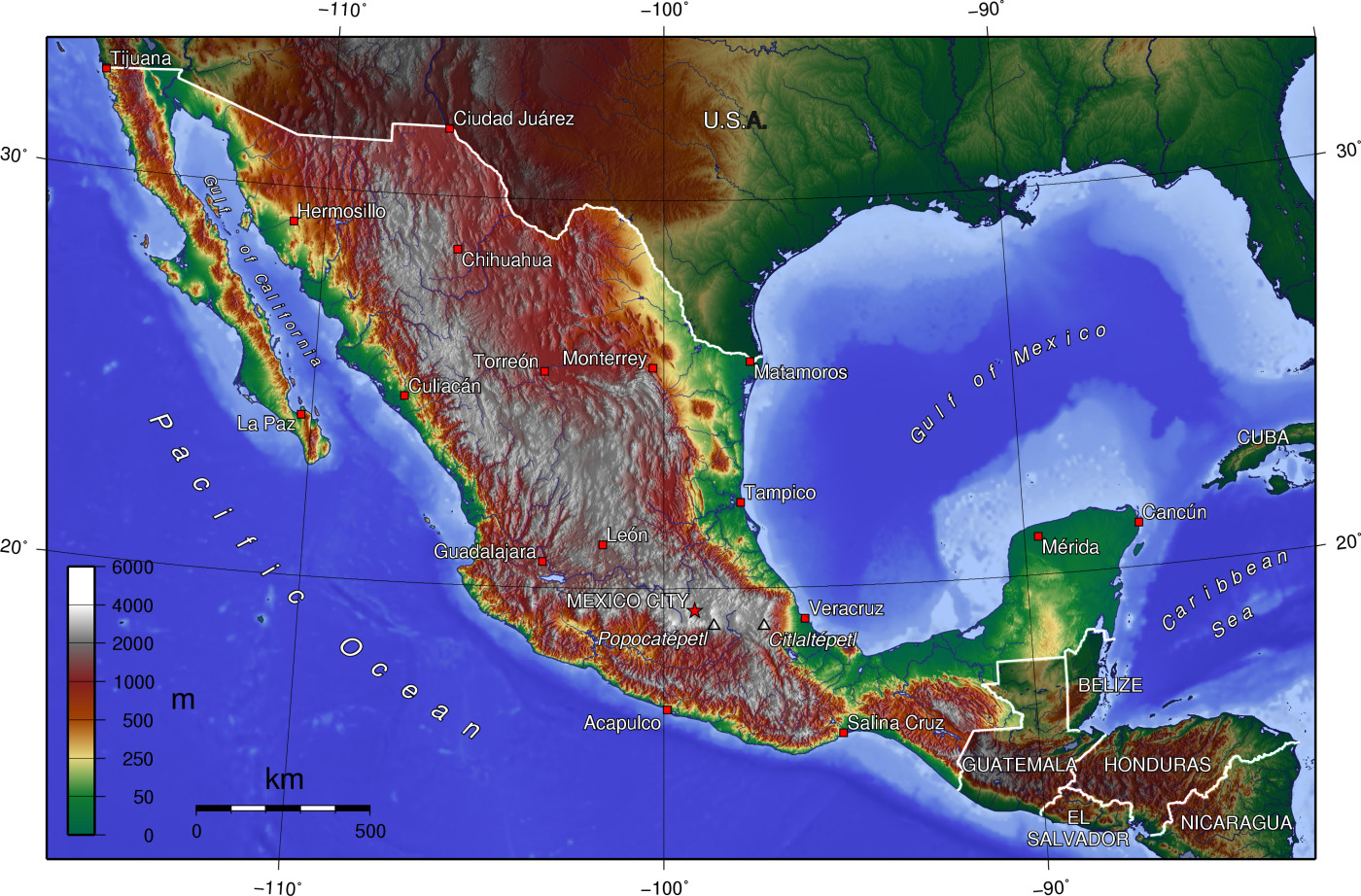
A topographic map of Mexico

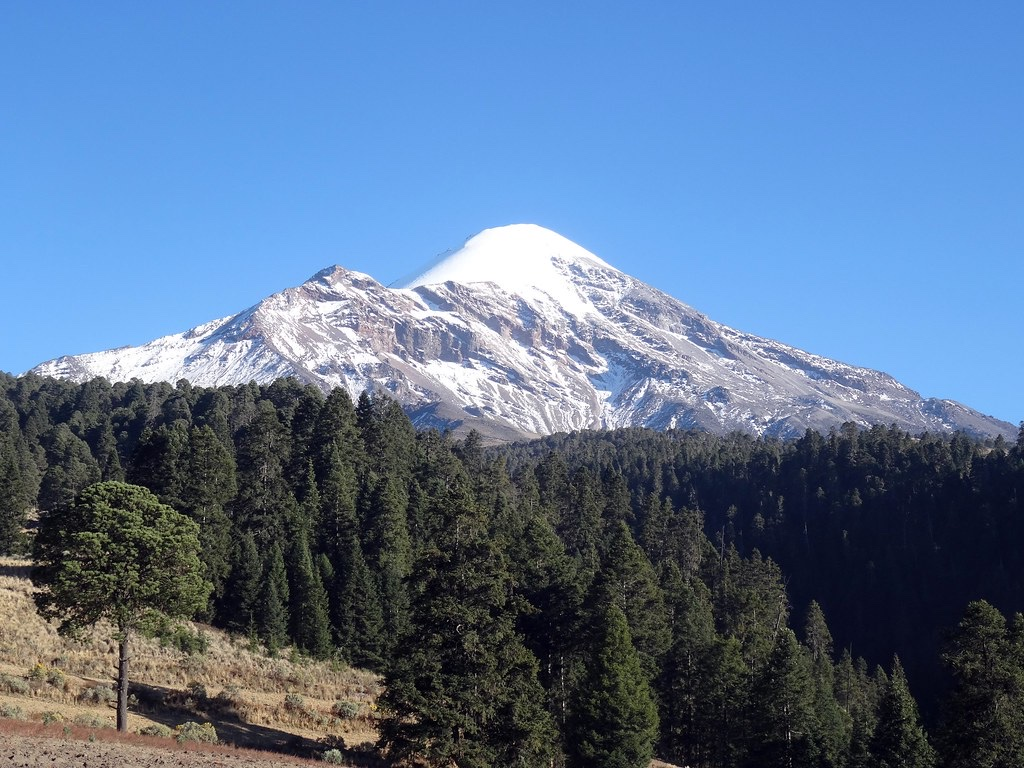
Pico de Orizaba, the highest mountain in Mexico

Mexico is located between latitudes 14° and 33°N, and longitudes 86° and 119°W in the southern portion of North America, with a total area of 1,972,550 km^{2} (761,606 sq mi), is the 13th largest country by total area. It has coastlines on the Pacific Ocean and Gulf of California, as well as the Gulf of Mexico and Caribbean Sea, the latter two forming part of the Atlantic Ocean. Within these seas are about 6,000 km^{2} (2,317 sq mi) of islands. Almost all of Mexico lies in the North American plate, with small parts of the Baja California peninsula on the Pacific and Cocos plates. Geophysically, some geographers include the territory east of the Isthmus of Tehuantepec (around 12% of the total) within Central America. Geopolitically, Mexico is entirely considered part of North America.

The majority of Mexican central and northern territories are located at high altitudes, and as such the highest elevations are found at the Trans-Mexican Volcanic Belt which crosses Mexico east to west: Pico de Orizaba (5,700 m or 18,701 ft), Popocatépetl (5,462 m or 17,920 ft) and Iztaccihuatl (5,286 m or 17,343 ft) and the Nevado de Toluca (4,577 m or 15,016 ft). Two mountain ranges known as Sierra Madre Oriental and Sierra Madre Occidental, which are the extension of the Rocky Mountains from northern North America crossed the country from north to south and a fourth mountain range, the Sierra Madre del Sur, runs from Michoacán to Oaxaca. The Mexican territory is prone to volcanism.

Mexico has nine distinct regions: Baja California, the Pacific Coastal Lowlands, the Mexican Plateau, the Sierra Madre Oriental, the Sierra Madre Occidental, the Cordillera Neovolcánica, the Gulf Coastal Plain, the Southern Highlands, and the Yucatán Peninsula. An important geologic feature of the Yucatán peninsula is the Chicxulub crater, the scientific consensus is that the Chicxulub impactor was responsible for the Cretaceous–Paleogene extinction event. Although Mexico is large (a little over 2,000 mi (3,219 km) in length from its farthest land points), much of its land mass is incompatible with agriculture due to aridity, soil, or terrain.

In 2018, an estimated 54.9% of land was agricultural; 11.8% was arable; 1.4% was in permanent crops; 41.7% was permanent pasture; and 33.3% was forest. Mexico is irrigated by several rivers, with the longest being the Rio Grande, which serves as a natural eastern border with the United States. The Usumacinta River serves as a natural southern border between Mexico and Guatemala.

=== Climate ===
A map of Mexico's climate types

The climate of Mexico is varied due to the country's size and topography. The Tropic of Cancer effectively divides the country into temperate and tropical zones. Land north of the Tropic of Cancer experiences cooler temperatures during the winter months. South of the Tropic of Cancer, temperatures are fairly constant year-round and vary solely as a function of elevation. This gives Mexico one of the world's most diverse weather systems.

Maritime air masses bring seasonal precipitation from May until August. Many parts of Mexico, particularly the north, have a dry climate with only sporadic rainfall, while parts of the tropical lowlands in the south average more than 2,000 mm (78.7 in) of annual precipitation. For example, many cities in the north like Monterrey, Hermosillo, and Mexicali experience temperatures of 40 °C (104 °F) or more in summer. In the Sonoran Desert temperatures reach 50 °C (122 °F) or more.

There are seven major climate types in Mexico with warm sub-humid climate being coastal up to 900 meters found mostly in the southern region of Mexico; dry and desertic climates being found in the northern half of the country; temperate humid and sub-humid being found mostly on pastures at an elevation of 1,800 meters and higher in central Mexico and cold climate usually found at an elevation of 3,500 meters and beyond. Most of the country's territory has a temperate to dry climate.

Areas south of the Tropic of Cancer with elevations up to 1,000 m (3,281 ft), the southern parts of both coastal plains as well as the Yucatán Peninsula, have a yearly median temperature between 24 and 28 °C (75.2 and 82.4 °F). Temperatures here remain high throughout the year, with only a 5 °C (9 °F) difference between winter and summer median temperatures. The Pacific coast is subject to natural hazards such as tsunamis and both Mexican coasts with the exception of the south coast of the Bay of Campeche and northern Baja California are vulnerable to serious hurricanes during the summer and fall. Although low-lying areas north of the Tropic of Cancer are hot and humid during the summer, they generally have lower yearly temperature averages (from 20 to 24 °C or 68.0 to 75.2 °F) because of more moderate conditions during the winter.

Climate change in Mexico is causing widespread impacts including rising temperatures, altered precipitation patterns, intensified hurricanes, and sea-level rise in coastal regions. These changes pose threats to water resources and agriculture (particularly for rural and smallholder farmers), and affect crops including maize and coffee, contributing to economic insecurity. Climate change is impacting Mexicans' health, exacerbating human migration, and increasing extinction risk for Mexico's biodiversity, as protected areas are expected to face warming temperatures and decreased precipitation.

=== Biodiversity ===
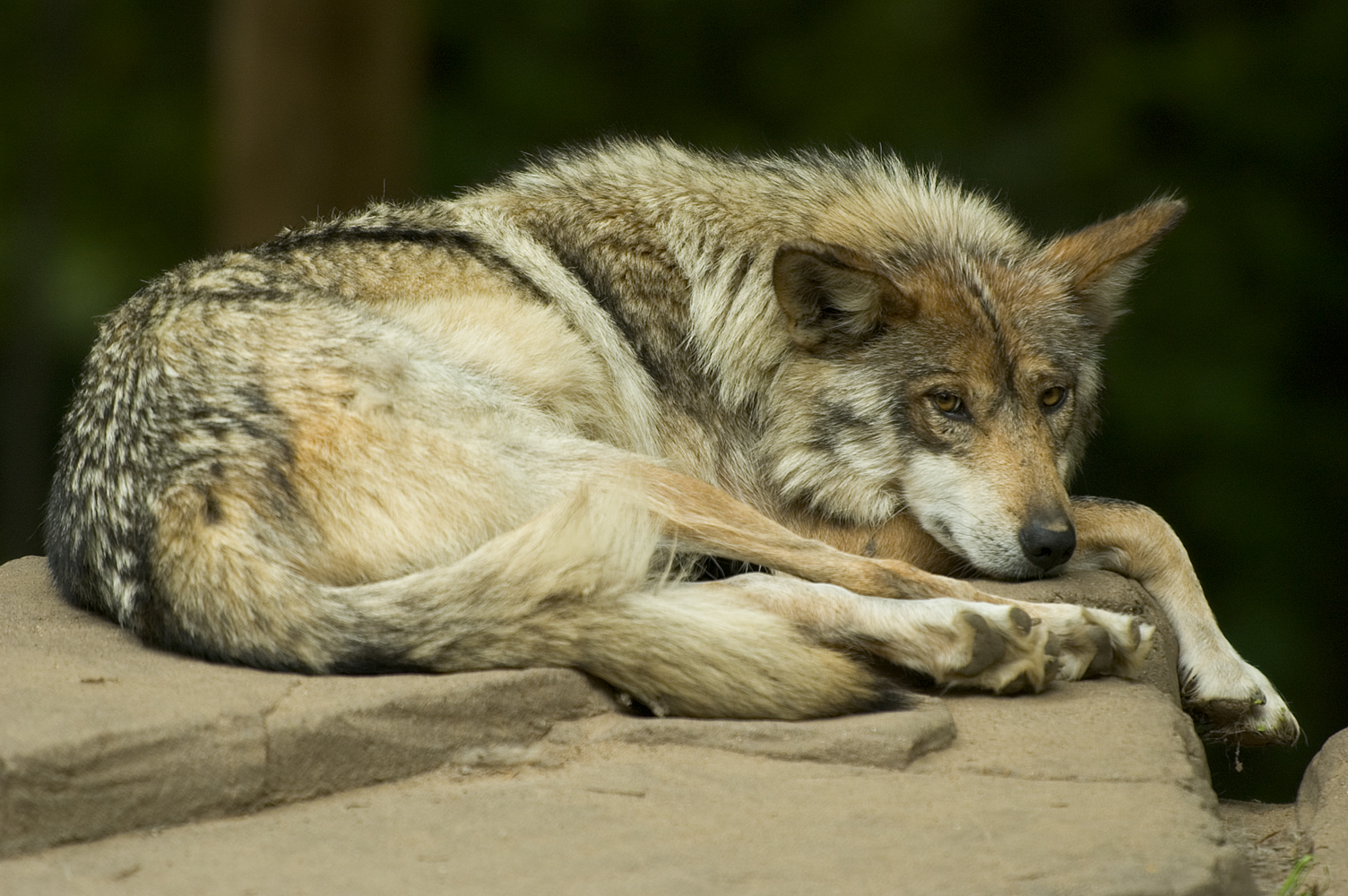
A Mexican wolf

Mexico ranks fourth in the world in biodiversity and is one of the 17 megadiverse countries. With over 200,000 species, Mexico is home of 10–12% of the world's biodiversity. Mexico ranks first in biodiversity in reptiles with 707 known species, second in mammals with 438 species, fourth in amphibians with 290 species, and fourth in flora, with 26,000 species. Mexico is also considered the second country in the world in ecosystems and fourth in overall species. About 2,500 species are protected by Mexican legislation.

In 2002, Mexico had the second fastest rate of deforestation in the world, second only to Brazil. It had a 2019 Forest Landscape Integrity Index mean score of 6.82/10, ranking it 63rd globally out of 172 countries. There is Deforestation and soil erosion, especially in rural areas of Mexico. In the 2022 report it was noted environmental protection laws have improved in major cities but remain unenforced or unregulated in rural regions.

In Mexico, 170,000 square kilometers (65,637 sq mi) are considered "Protected Natural Areas". These include 34 biosphere reserves, 67 national parks, 4 natural monuments, 26 areas of protected flora and fauna, 4 areas for natural resource protection and 17 sanctuaries (zones rich in diverse species). Some of Mexico's native culinary ingredients include maize, tomato, beans, squash, chocolate, vanilla, avocado, guava, chayote, epazote, camote, jícama, nopal, zucchini, tejocote, huitlacoche, sapote, mamey sapote, and a great variety of chiles, such as the habanero and the jalapeño. Tequila, the distilled alcoholic drink made from cultivated agave cacti is a major industry. Because of its high biodiversity Mexico has also been a frequent site of bioprospecting by international research bodies.

== Government and politics ==
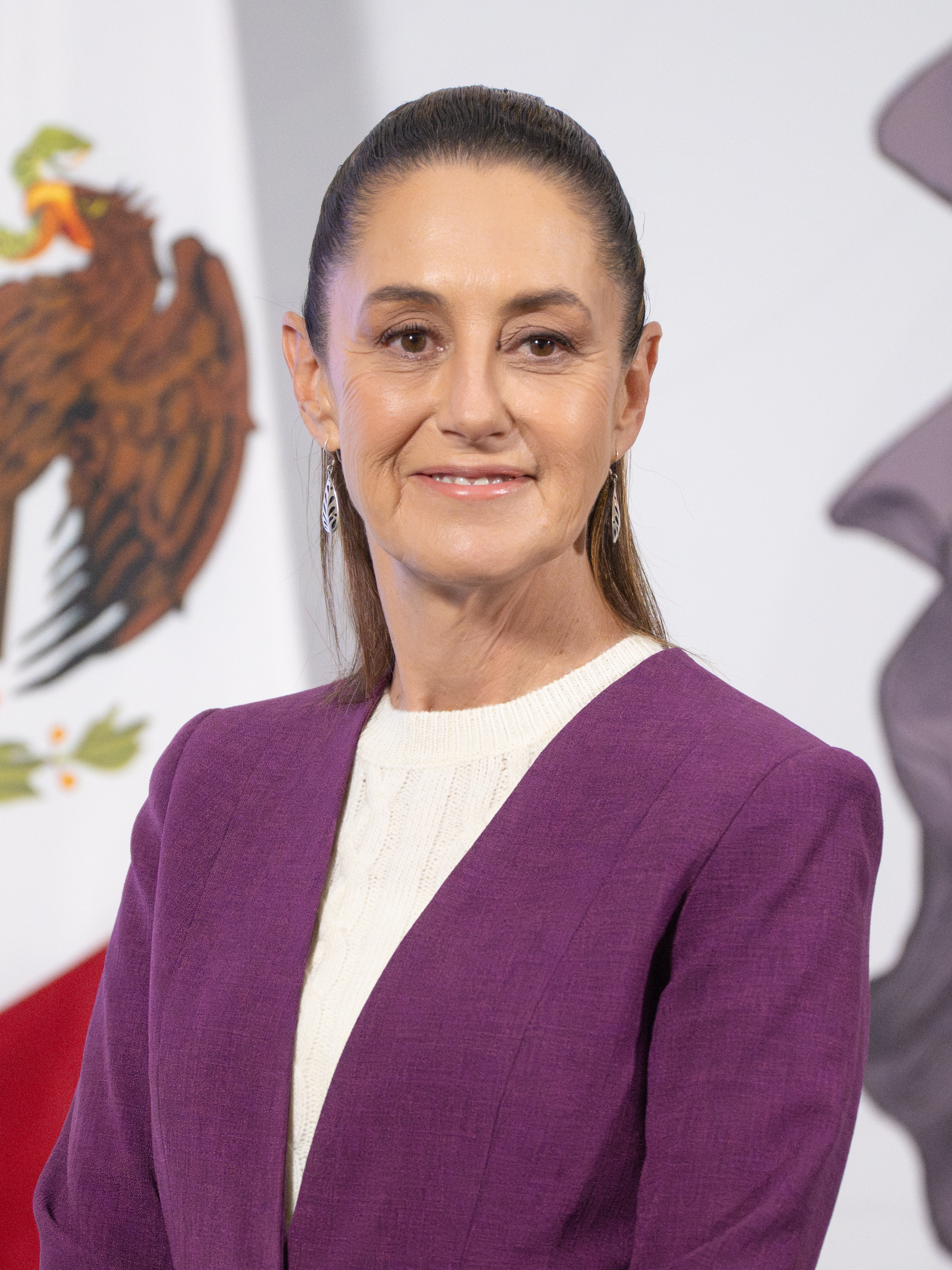
Claudia Sheinbaum
President

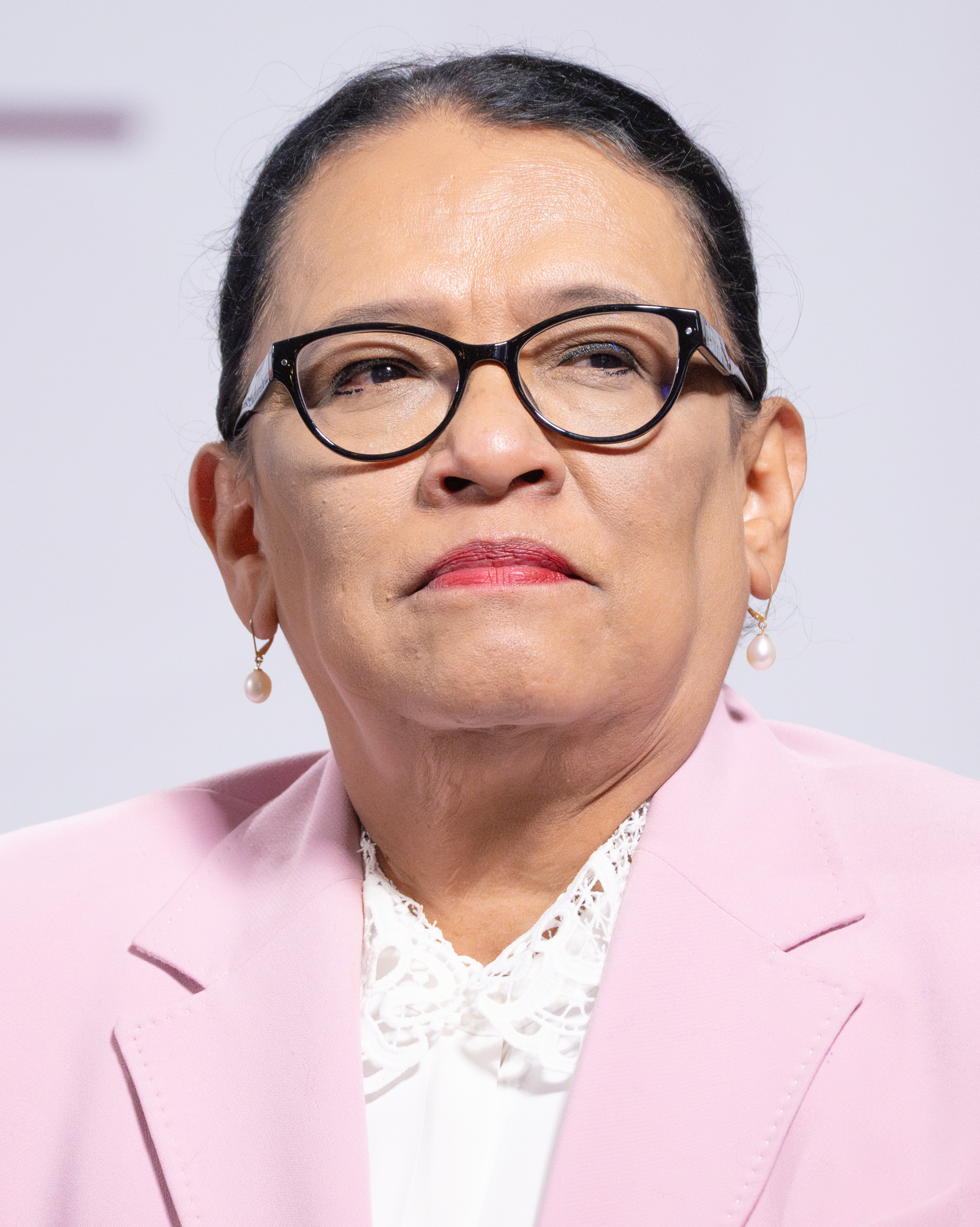
Rosa Icela Rodríguez
Secretary of the Interior

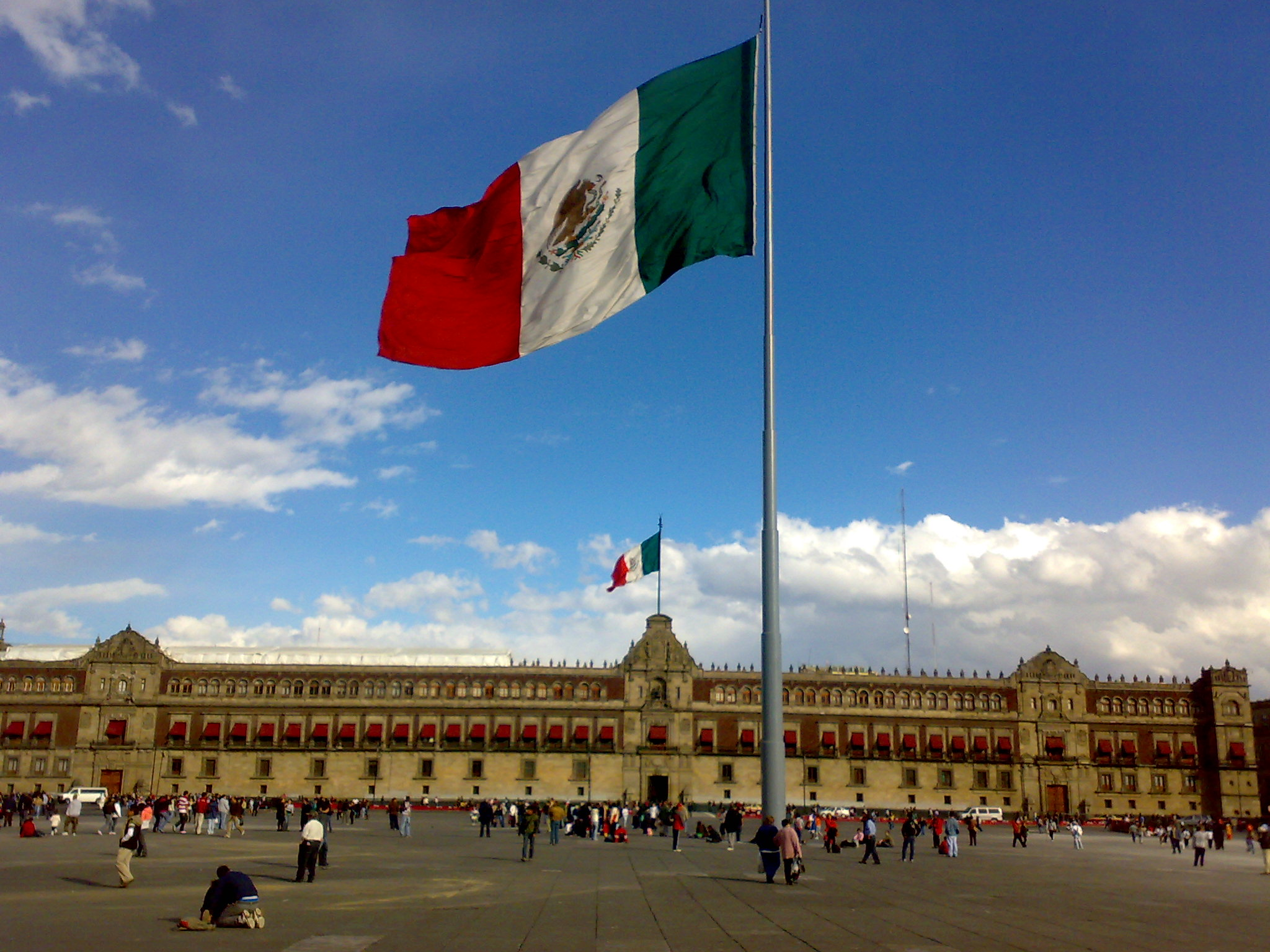
The National Palace on the east side of Plaza de la Constitución or Zócalo, the main square of Mexico City; it was the residence of viceroys and Presidents of Mexico and now the seat of the Mexican government

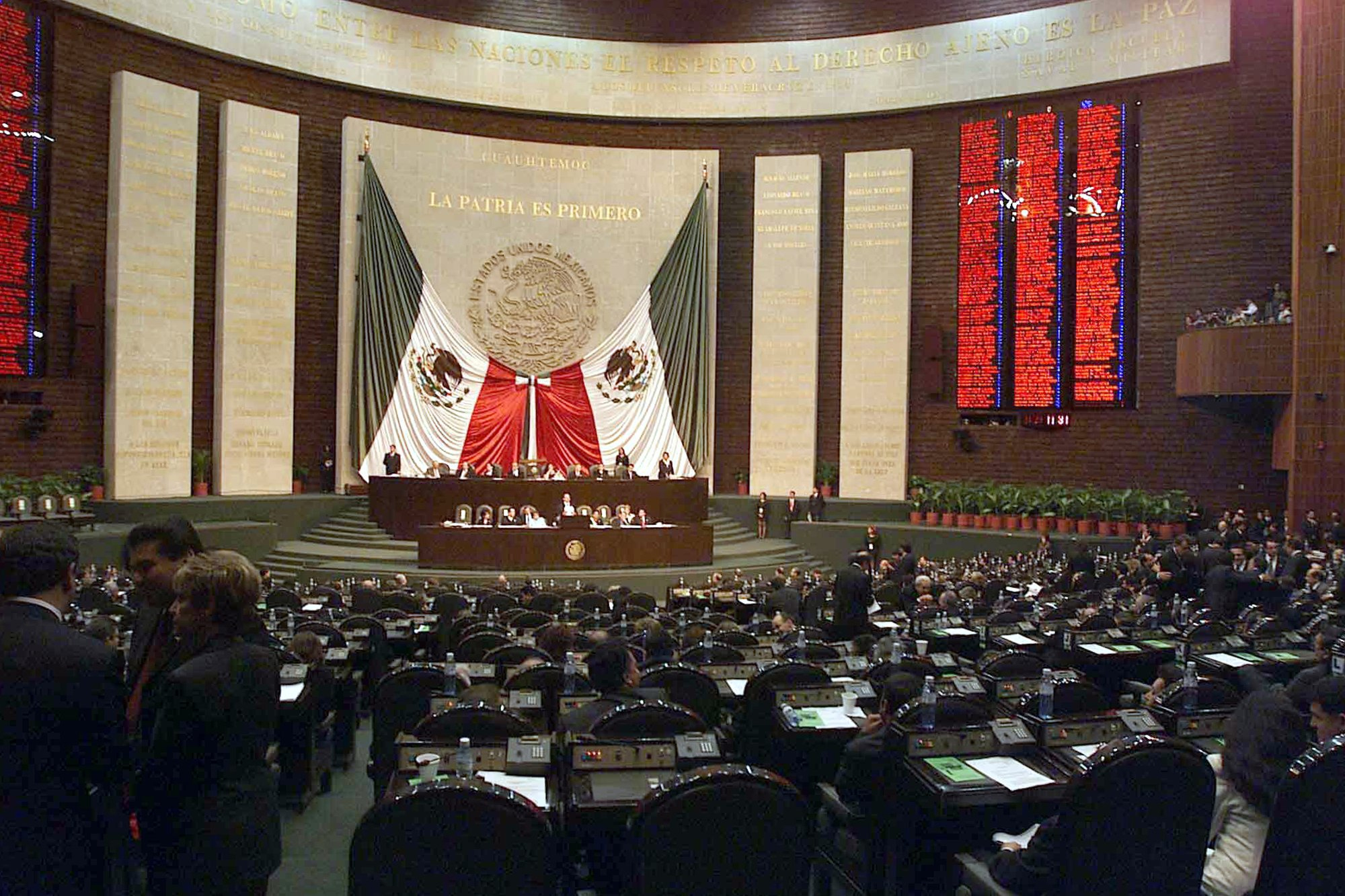
The Chamber of Deputies, the lower house of the Congress of Mexico

The United Mexican States is a federation whose government is representative, democratic, and republican based on a presidential system according to the 1917 Constitution. The Constitution establishes three levels of government: the federal Union, the state governments, and the municipal governments.

The federal legislature is the bicameral Congress of the Union, composed of the Senate of the Republic and the Chamber of Deputies. The Congress makes federal law, declares war, imposes taxes, approves the national budget and international treaties, and ratifies diplomatic appointments. The federal Congress, and the state legislatures, are elected by a system of parallel voting that includes plurality and proportional representation.

The Chamber of Deputies has 500 deputies. 300 are elected by plurality vote in single-member districts, the federal electoral districts. 200 are elected by proportional representation with closed party lists, for which Mexico is divided into five electoral constituencies. The Senate has 128 senators: 64 (two for each state and two for Mexico City) are elected by plurality vote in pairs, 32 are the first minority or first-runner-up (one for each state and one for Mexico City), and 32 are elected by proportional representation from national closed party lists.

The executive is the President of the United Mexican States, who is the head of state and government, and the commander-in-chief of the Mexican military forces. The President appoints the Cabinet and other officers. The President is responsible for executing and enforcing the law and has the power to veto bills.

The highest organ of the judicial branch of government is the Supreme Court of Justice, the national supreme court. Judges, pre-selected by Congress, are elected by popular vote. The nine members of the Supreme Court are elected for a single twelve-year term. The first judicial election occurred in 2025. The Supreme Court of Justice interprets laws and judges cases of federal competency. Other institutions of the judiciary are the Federal Electoral Tribunal, collegiate, unitary, and district tribunals, and the Judicial Disciplinary Tribunal.

Three parties have historically been the dominant parties in Mexican politics. The Institutional Revolutionary Party (PRI), is a catch-all party and member of the Socialist International founded in 1929 to unite all the factions of the Mexican Revolution and as held an almost hegemonic power in Mexican politics since then. The National Action Party (PAN), is a conservative party founded in 1939 and belongs to the Christian Democrat Organization of America. The Party of the Democratic Revolution (PRD), is a left-wing party, founded in 1989 as the successor of the coalition of socialists and liberal parties. The National Regeneration Movement (Morena), a left-wing populist party, has been the ruling party since 2018. It won a second term in the 2024 general election.

Democratic backsliding starting around 2019 was found by the V-Dem Democracy Report.

=== Administrative divisions ===
The boundaries and constituent units of Mexico evolved from its colonial-era origins. Central America peacefully separated from Mexico after independence in 1821. Yucatán was briefly an independent republic. Texas separated in the Texas Revolution and when it was annexed to the U.S. in 1845, it set the stage for the Mexican–American War and major territorial loss to the U.S. The sale of northern territory known in the U.S. as the Gadsden Purchase was the last loss of Mexican territory. The United Mexican States is a federation of 31 free and sovereign states, which form a union that exercises a degree of jurisdiction over Mexico City. Each state has its constitution, congress, and a judiciary, and its citizens elect by direct voting a governor for a six-year term, and representatives to their respective unicameral state congresses for three-year terms. Mexico City is a special political division that belongs to the federation as a whole and not to a particular state. Formerly known as the Federal District, its autonomy was previously limited relative to that of the states. It dropped this designation in 2016 and is in the process of achieving greater political autonomy by becoming a federal entity with its constitution and congress. The states are divided into municipalities, the smallest administrative political entity in the country, governed by a mayor or municipal president (presidente municipal), elected by its residents by plurality.

=== Foreign relations ===
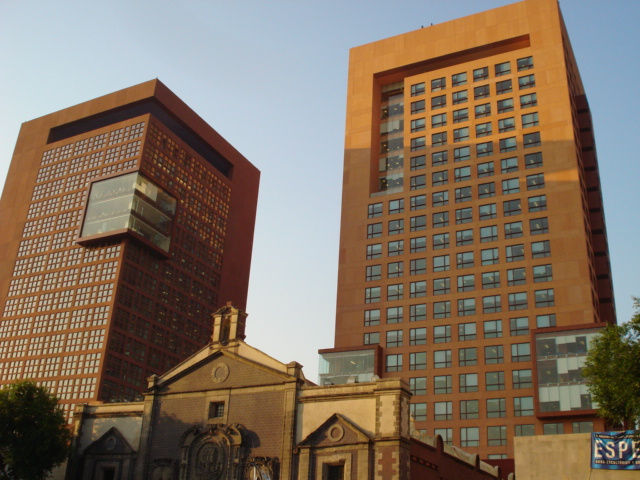
Headquarters of the Secretariat of Foreign Affairs

The foreign relations of Mexico are directed by the President of Mexico and managed through the Ministry of Foreign Affairs. The principles of the foreign policy are constitutionally recognized in the Article 89, Section 10, which include: respect for international law and legal equality of states, their sovereignty and independence, trend to non-interventionism in the domestic affairs of other countries, peaceful resolution of conflicts, and promotion of collective security through active participation in international organizations. Since the 1930s, the Estrada Doctrine has served as a crucial complement to these principles.

Mexico is a founding member of several international organizations, most notably the United Nations, the Organization of American States, the Organization of Ibero-American States, the OPANAL and the CELAC. In 2008, Mexico contributed over 40 million dollars to the United Nations regular budget. In addition, it was the only Latin American member of the Organisation for Economic Co-operation and Development since it joined in 1994 until Chile gained full membership in 2010.

Mexico is considered a regional power hence its presence in major economic groups such as the G8+5 and the G-20. Since the 1990s Mexico has sought a reform of the United Nations Security Council and its working methods with the support of Canada, Italy, Pakistan and other nine countries, which form a group informally called the Coffee Club.

It has an observer status at the Council of Europe.

=== Military ===
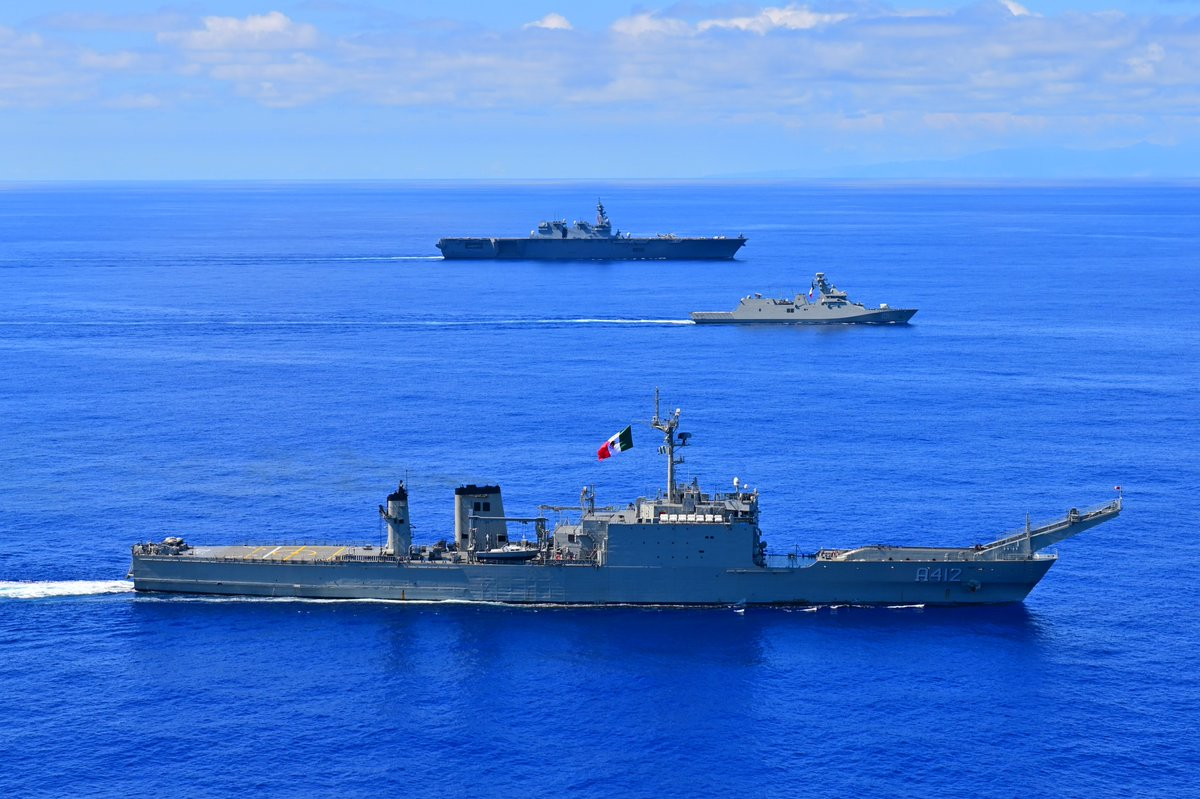
From foreground to background: Papaloapan-class Usumacinta, Mexican-Dutch-made Reformador-class Benito Juárez and Japananese Izumo-class carrier, 2022

The Mexican Armed Forces are administered by the Secretariat of National Defense (Secretaria de Defensa Nacional, SEDENA). There are two branches: the Mexican Army (which includes the Mexican Air Force) and Mexican Navy. The National Guard, which was formed in 2019 from the disbanded Federal Police and military police of the Army and Navy, functions as a gendarmerie; while responsible for law enforcement, it is placed under military command. Figures vary, but as of 2024, there are approximately 220,000 armed forces personnel: 160,000 Army; 10,000 Air Force; and 50,000 Navy, including about 20,000 marines. The National Guard has roughly 110,000 personnel. Military expenditures are a small fraction of GDP, at around 0.6% as of 2023.

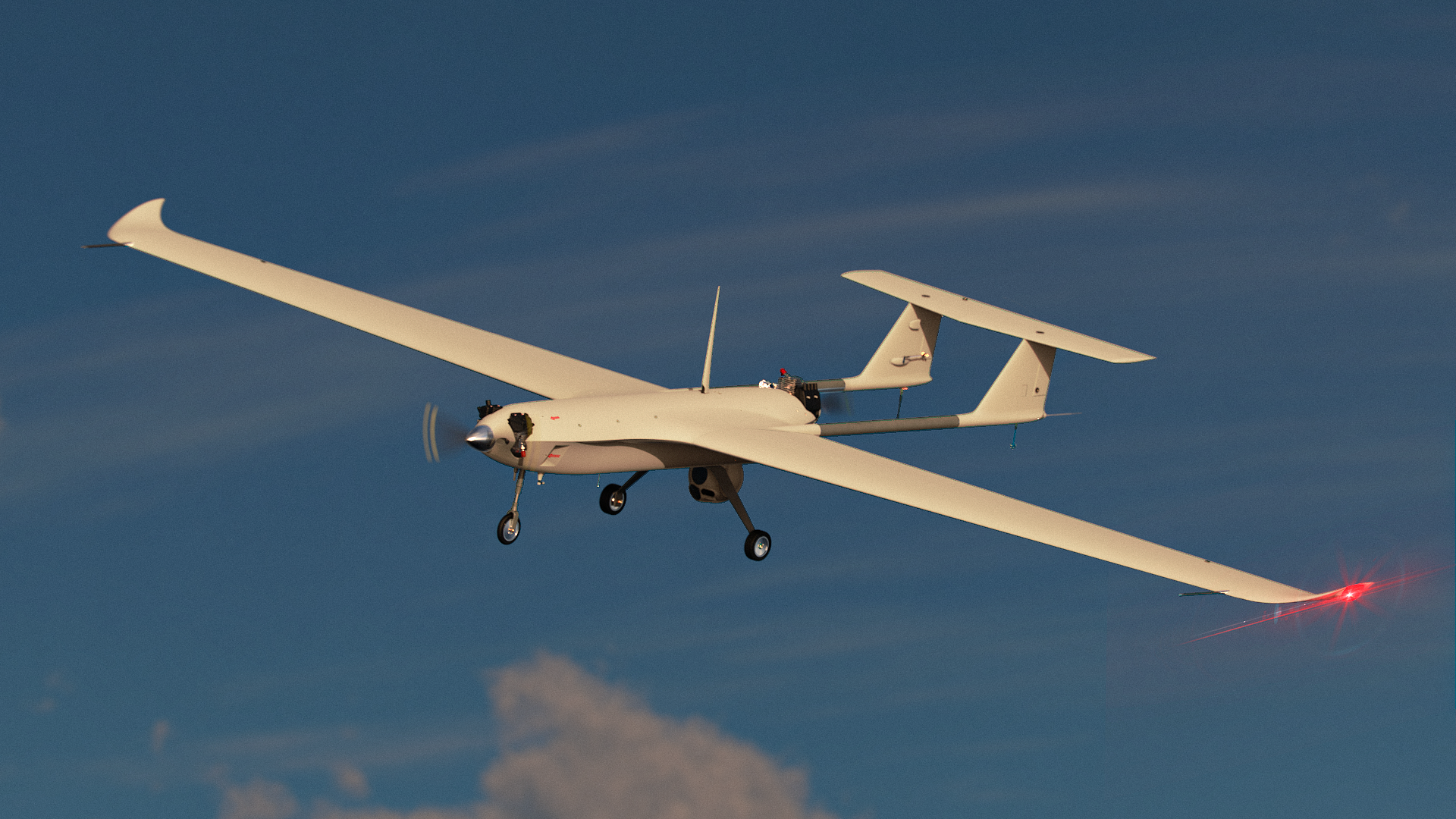
Mexican-made S-45 BAALAM UAV by Hydra Technologies, 2022

The Mexican Armed Forces maintain significant infrastructure, including facilities for the design, research, and testing of weapons, vehicles, aircraft, naval vessels, defense systems and electronics; military industry manufacturing centers for building such systems; and advanced naval dockyards that build heavy military vessels and advanced missile technologies. Since the 1990s, when the military escalated its role in the war on drugs, increasing importance has been placed on acquiring airborne surveillance platforms, aircraft, helicopters, digital war-fighting technologies, urban warfare equipment and rapid troop transport. Mexico has the capabilities to manufacture nuclear weapons, but abandoned this possibility with the Treaty of Tlatelolco in 1968, pledging to use its nuclear technology only for peaceful purposes. Mexico signed the UN treaty on the Prohibition of Nuclear Weapons.

Historically, Mexico has remained neutral in international conflicts, with the exception of World War II. However, in recent years some political parties have proposed an amendment of the Constitution to allow the Mexican Army, Air Force or Navy to collaborate with the United Nations in peacekeeping missions, or to provide military help to countries that officially ask for it.

=== Law enforcement and human rights ===
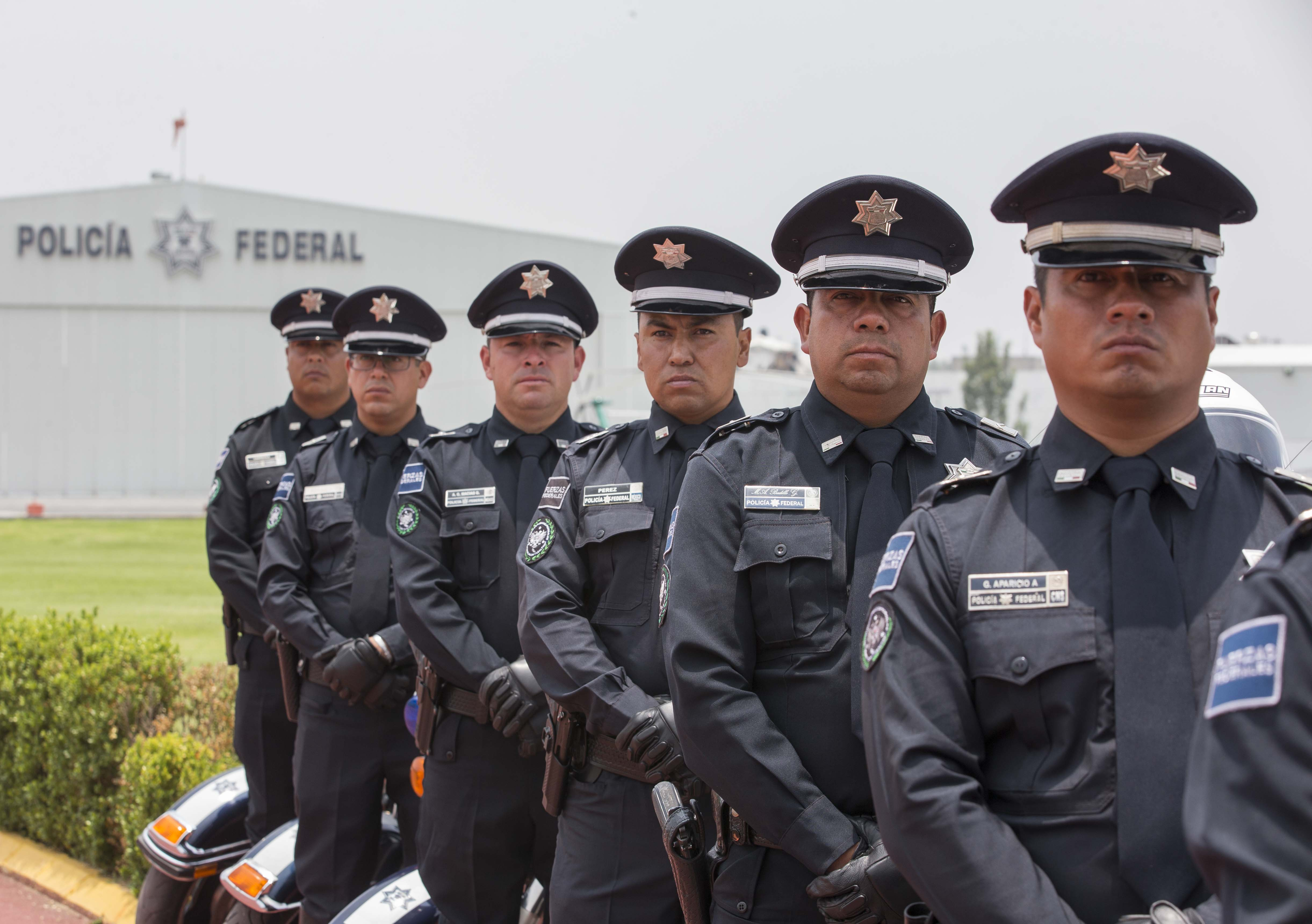
Mexican Federal Police celebration

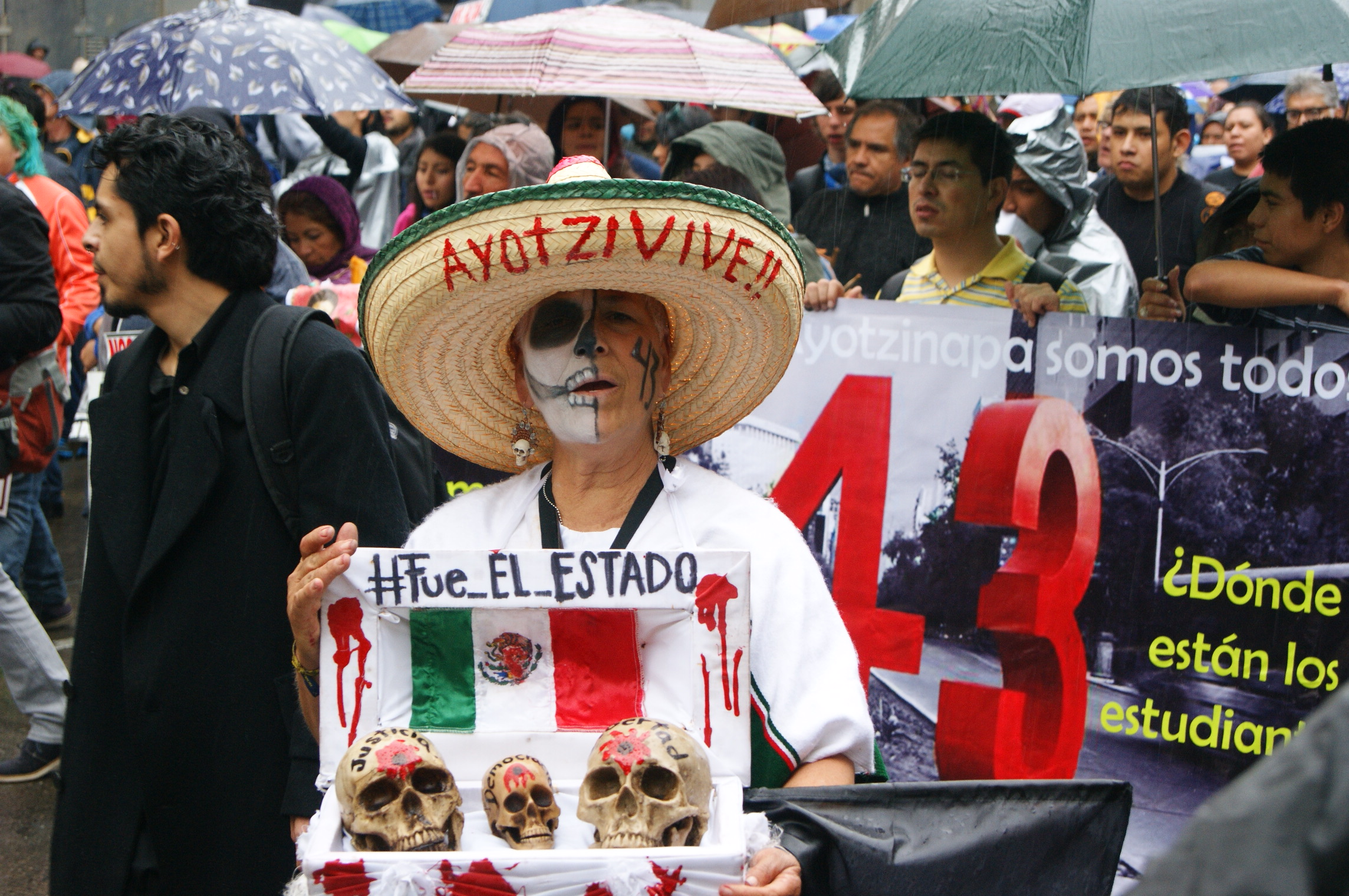
Demonstration on 26 September 2015, in the first anniversary of the disappearance of the 43 students in the Mexican town of Iguala

The Mexican Federal Police was dissolved in 2019 by a constitutional amendment during the administration of President López Obrador, being replaced by the National Guard, a national gendarmerie formed from units and assets of the Federal Police, Military Police, and Naval Police. As of 2022, the National Guard numbered 110,000 personnel. López Obrador had increasingly used military forces for domestic law enforcement, particularly against drug cartels. There have been serious abuses of power reported in security operations in the southern part of the country and in indigenous communities and poor urban neighborhoods. The National Human Rights Commission has had little impact in reversing this trend, engaging mostly in documentation but failing to use its powers to issue public condemnations to the officials who ignore its recommendations. Most Mexicans have low confidence in the police or the judicial system, and therefore, few crimes are actually reported by the citizens. There have been public demonstrations of outrage against what is considered a culture of impunity.

Mexico has fully recognized same-sex marriage since 2022, and anti-discrimination laws regarding sexual orientation have existed in the nation since 2003. However, hate crimes towards the LGBT community remain an issue in Mexico. Other crime and human rights violations in Mexico have been criticized, including enforced disappearances (kidnappings), abuses against migrants, extrajudicial killings, gender-based violence, especially femicide, and attacks on journalists and human rights advocates. A 2020 report by the BBC gives statistics on crime in Mexico, with 10.7 million households with at least one victim of crime. As of May 2022, 100,000 people are officially listed as missing, most since 2007 when President Calderón attempted to stop the drug cartels. Drug cartels remain a major issue in Mexico, with a proliferation of smaller cartels when larger ones are broken up and increasingly the use of more sophisticated military equipment and tactics.

Mexico's drug war, ongoing since 2006, has left over 120,000 dead and perhaps another 37,000 missing. Mexico's National Geography and Statistics Institute estimated that in 2014, one-fifth of Mexicans were victims of some sort of crime. The mass kidnapping of 43 students in Iguala on 26 September 2014 triggered nationwide protests against the government's weak response to the disappearances and widespread corruption that gives free rein to criminal organizations. More than 100 journalists and media workers have been killed or disappeared since 2000, and most of these crimes remained unsolved, improperly investigated, and with few perpetrators arrested and convicted. In August 2025, demonstrations were held all around Mexico, in protest over the 130,000 people who have disappeared and considered missing since 2007.

== Economy ==
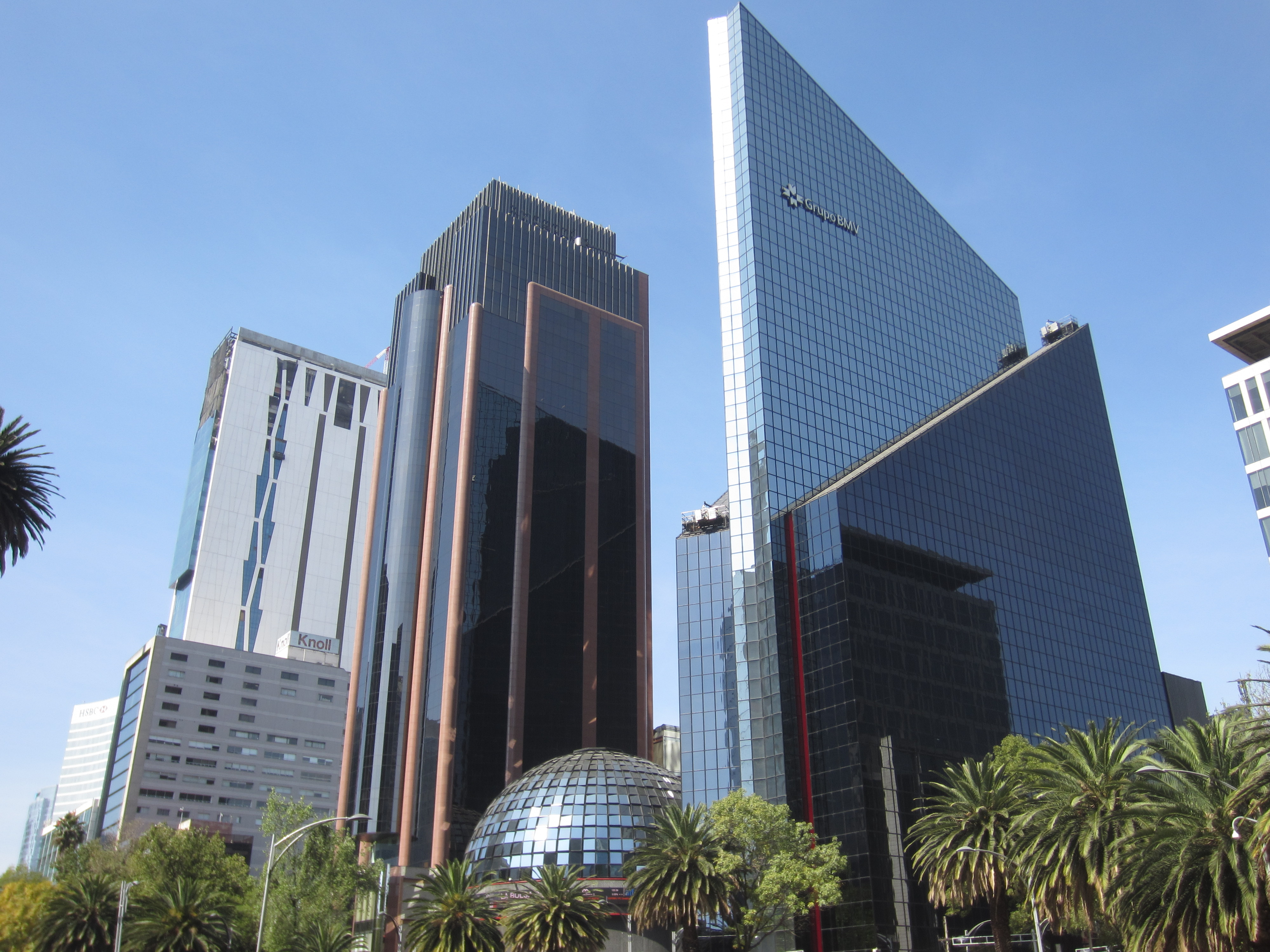
Mexican Stock Exchange building, in Mexico City

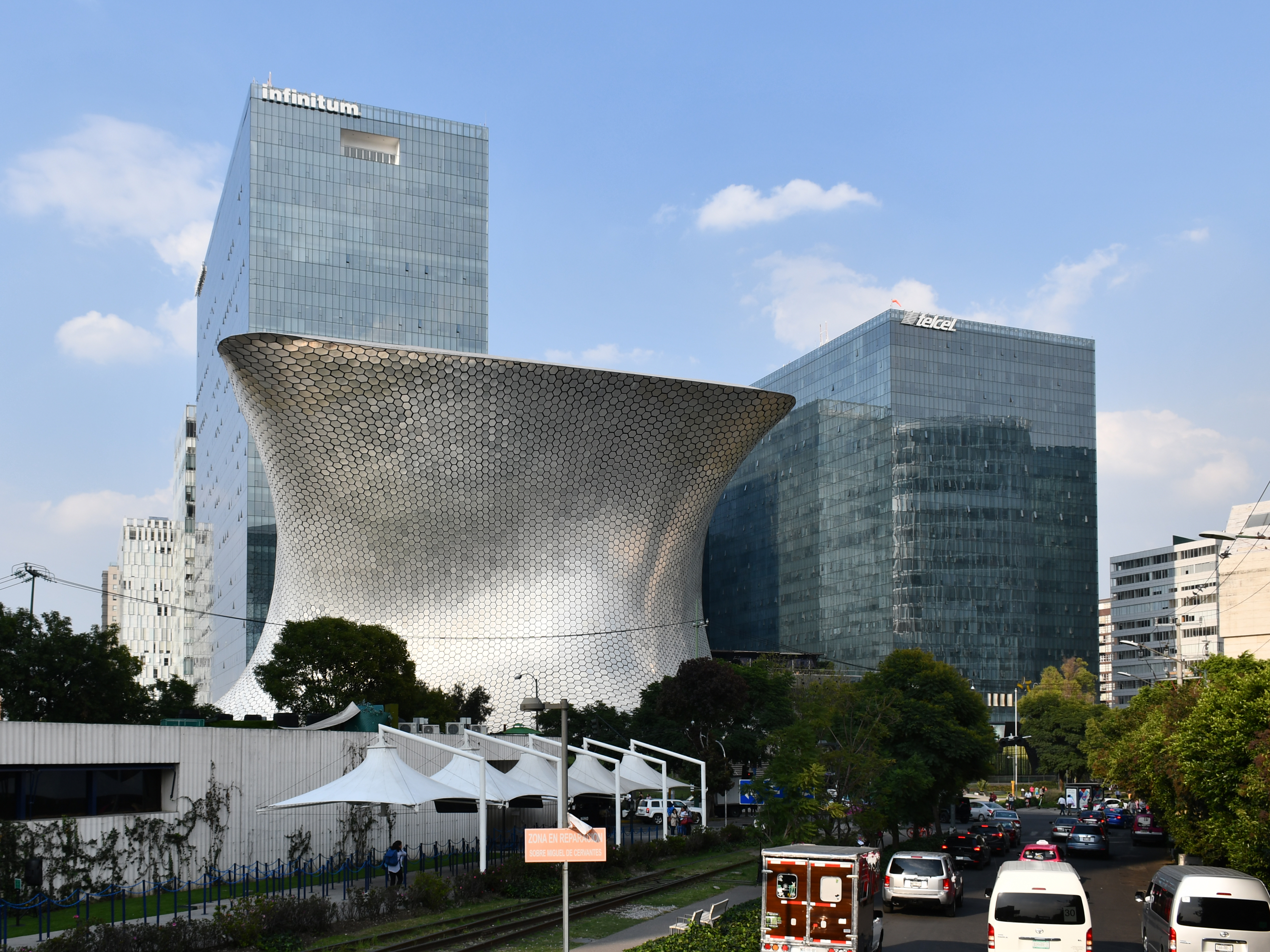
Headquarters of América Móvil in Mexico City, the largest mobile network operator outside Asia

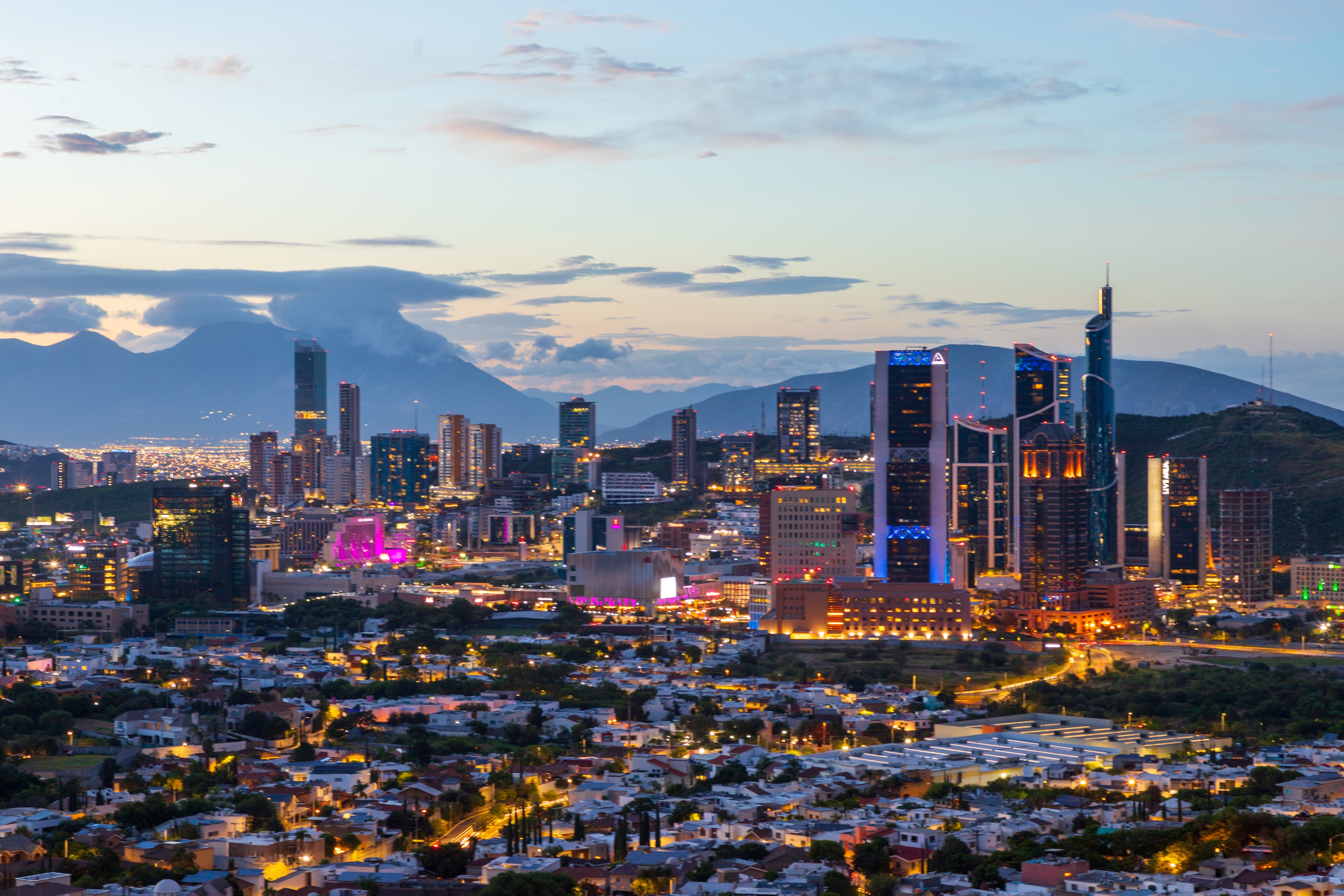
Skyscrapers in San Pedro Garza García, Nuevo León

As of April 2026, Mexico has the 13th largest economy by purchasing power parity (PPP) (US$3.5 trillion), and a GDP per capita of US$26,643. The World Bank reported in 2026 that the country's gross national income was the second highest in Latin America after Brazil at US$1.8 trillion.

Mexico has the sixth largest electronics industry after China, the US, Japan, South Korea, and Taiwan. Mexico is the second-largest exporter of electronics to the US where it exported $71 billion worth of electronics in 2011. Electronics exports grew 73% between 2002 and 2012. The manufactured value-added sector, which electronics is part of, accounted for 18% of GDP.

Mexico produces the most automobiles of any North American nation. The industry produces technologically complex components and engages in research and development. The "Big Three" (General Motors, Ford and Chrysler) have been operating in Mexico since the 1930s, while Volkswagen and Nissan built their plants in the 1960s. In Puebla alone, 70 industrial part-makers cluster around Volkswagen. In 2016 Kia opened a $1 billion factory in Nuevo León, with Audi also opening an assembling plant in Puebla the same year. BMW, Mercedes-Benz and Nissan currently have plants in construction. The domestic car industry is represented by DINA S.A., which has built buses and trucks since 1962, and the new Mastretta company that builds the high-performance Mastretta MXT sports car. In 2006, trade with the US and Canada accounted for almost 50% of Mexico's exports and 45% of its imports.

During the first three quarters of 2010, the United States had a $46 billion trade deficit with Mexico. The remittances from Mexican citizens working in the US are significant; after dipping during the 2008 Great Recession and the COVID-19 pandemic in 2021 they are topping other sources of foreign income. Remittances are directed to Mexico by direct links from a U.S. government banking program.

Although multiple international organizations coincide and classify Mexico as an upper middle income country, or a middle class country, Mexico's National Council for the Evaluation of Social Development Policy (CONEVAL), reports that much of Mexico's population lives in poverty. From 2008 to 2010 the portion who live in poverty rose from 44.5% to 46.2% (from 48.8 to 52 million people). Despite this, INEGI reported in 2025 that the poverty rate had decreased, between 2018 and 2024, a 12.3% decrease, from 41.9% to 29.6% (from 51.9 to 38.5 million people), the extreme poverty decreased from 7% to 5.3% (from 8.7 to 7 million people), and those lacking access to healthcare has significantly increased, from 16.2% to 34.2% (44.5 million people), though some specialists expressed doubt regarding the accuracy of these rates. According to the OECD's poverty line (defined as the percentage of the population who earns 60% or less of the national median income) 20% of Mexico's population lived in poverty in 2019.

Among OECD countries, Mexico has the second-highest degree of inequality between the extremely poor and rich, after Chile– though it is one of few countries in which this has been falling. The bottom ten percent in the income hierarchy disposes of 1.4% of the country's resources, whereas the upper ten percent dispose of 36%. The OECD notes that Mexico's budgeted expenses for poverty alleviation and social development are only about a third of the OECD average. This is also reflected in infant mortality in Mexico, which is three times higher than the OECD average, whereas its literacy is in the median range. According to a 2008 report the average income in an urban area of Mexico was $27,000, while in rural areas just miles away was, it only $8,000. Daily minimum wages are set annually; it was set at $315.04 Mexican pesos (US$17.20) in 2026 ($440.87 in the country's northern border), making it comparable to Costa Rica, Uruguay, and Chile. This was a rapid increase, as it had been set at 88 pesos in 2018.

=== Communications ===
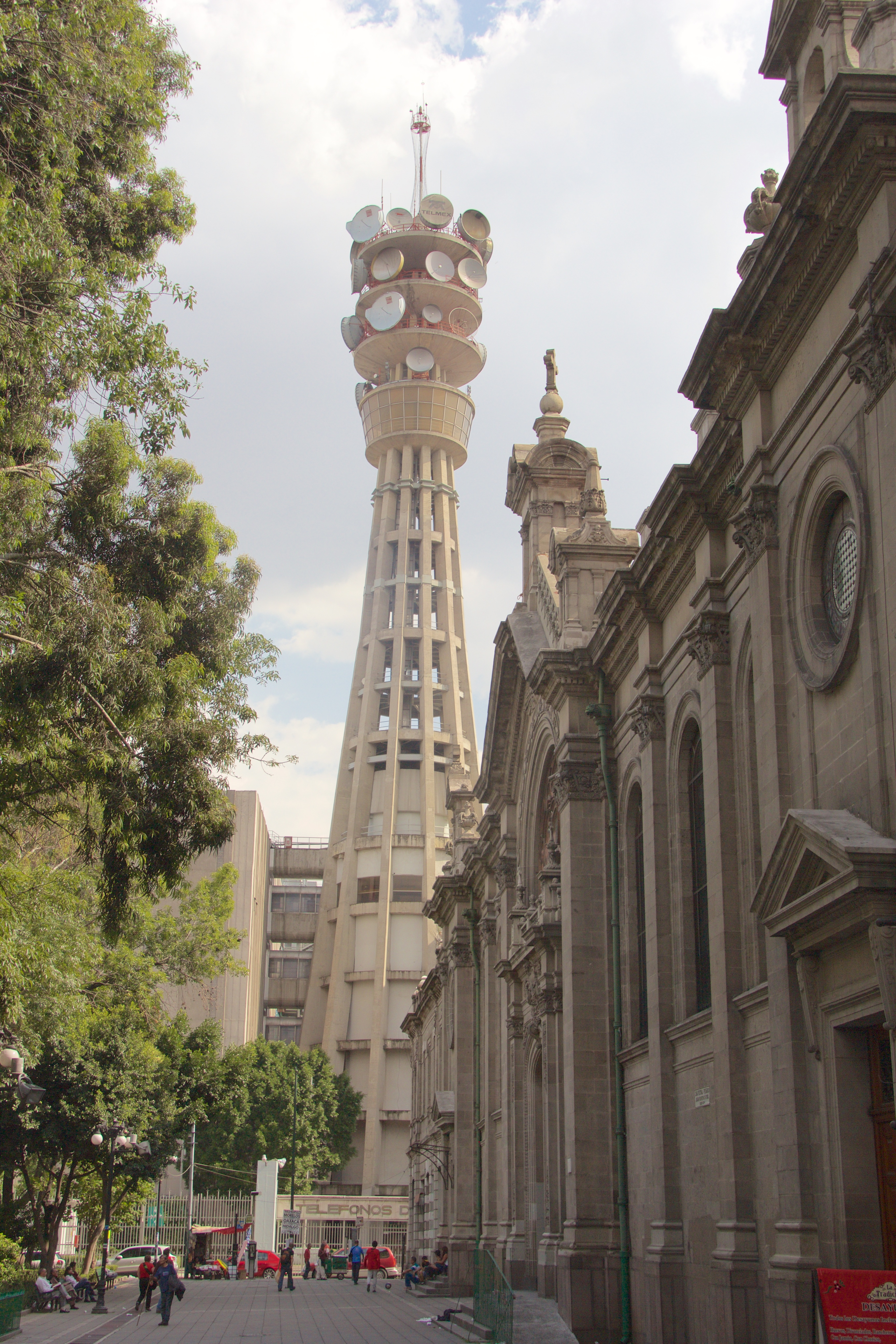
Telmex Tower in Mexico City

The telecommunications industry is mostly dominated by Telmex (Teléfonos de México), previously a government monopoly privatized in 1990. By 2006, Telmex had expanded its operations to Colombia, Peru, Chile, Argentina, Brazil, Uruguay, and the United States. Other players are Axtel, Maxcom, Alestra, Marcatel, AT&T Mexico. Because of Mexican orography, providing a landline telephone service at remote mountainous areas is expensive, and the penetration of line-phones per capita is low compared to other Latin American countries, at 52% percent; however, 81% of Mexican households have internet connection and 81% over the age of 6 have a mobile phone. Mobile telephony has the advantage of reaching all areas at a lower cost, and the total number of mobile lines is almost two times that of landlines, with an estimation of 97 million lines. The telecommunication industry is regulated by the government through Cofetel (Comisión Federal de Telecomunicaciones).

The satellite system is domestic and operates 120 earth stations. There is extensive microwave radio relay network and considerable use of fiber-optic and coaxial cable. Mexican satellites are operated by Satélites Mexicanos (Satmex), a private company, leader in Latin America and servicing North and South America.

=== Energy ===
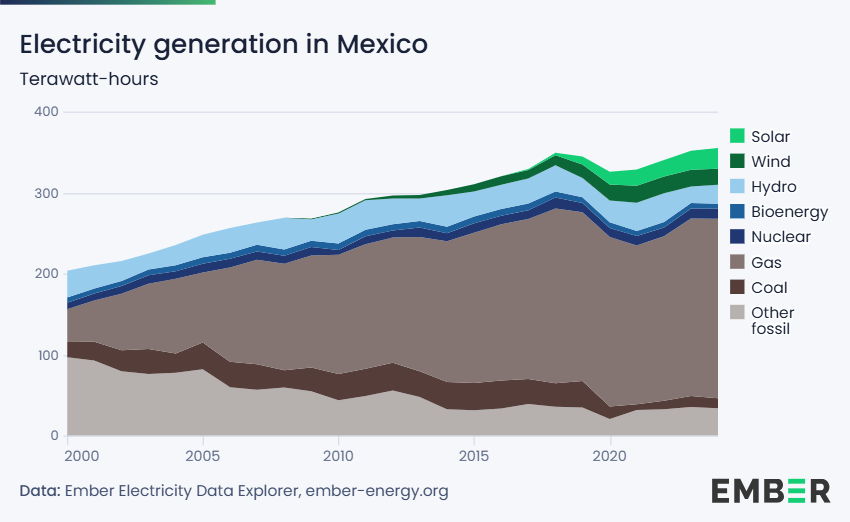
Electricity generation in Mexico in terawatt-hours

Energy production is managed by the state-owned companies Federal Commission of Electricity and Pemex. Pemex, the public company in charge of exploration, extraction, transportation, and marketing of crude oil and natural gas, as well as the refining and distribution of petroleum products and petrochemicals, is one of the largest companies in the world by revenue, making US$86 billion sales per year. Mexico is the sixth-largest oil producer, with 3.7 million barrels per day. In 1980 oil exports accounted for 62% of total exports; by 2000 it was only 7%. Mexico owns 7 oil refineries on its territory, with the newest built in 2022 and another refinery within the US. Mexico has 60 hydroelectric power plants which generate 12% of the country's electricity, the largest is the 2,400 MW Manuel Moreno Torres Dam on the Grijalva River, the world's fourth most productive hydroelectric plant.

Mexico has the third-largest solar power potential estimated at 5kWh/m^{2} daily, which corresponds to 50 times the national electricity generation. There is over 1 million square meters of solar thermal panels installed, while in 2005 there were only 115,000 square meters of solar PV (photo-voltaic) panels. The project SEGH-CFE 1 located in Puerto Libertad, Sonora in the Northwest of Mexico was completed in 2018 and has a capacity of 46.8 MW from an array of 187,200 solar panels, all of its generated electricity is sold directly to the CFE and absorbed into the utility's transmission system. The Villanueva solar park in Coahuila which opened in 2019, is the largest solar power plant in the Americas with a capacity of 828 MW. Mexico has one nuclear power plant, the Laguna Verde Nuclear Power Station located in the state of Veracruz and numerous wind farms, with the largest wind farm in Latin America located in Oaxaca.

Although Mexico has increased its renewable electricity generation from wind and solar sources, it is still dependent on fossil fuels for most of its energy. In 2023 Mexico was in the top 15 highest greenhouse gas emitters, contributing over 5 million tonnes, or 1.4% of the global total. Mexico has committed to reducing greenhouse gas emissions by 35% by 2030, with an increased target of 40% conditional upon external support. The country aims to cut black carbon emissions by 51% unconditionally and 70% with additional support by 2030 and has committed to net zero by 2050.

=== Science and technology ===
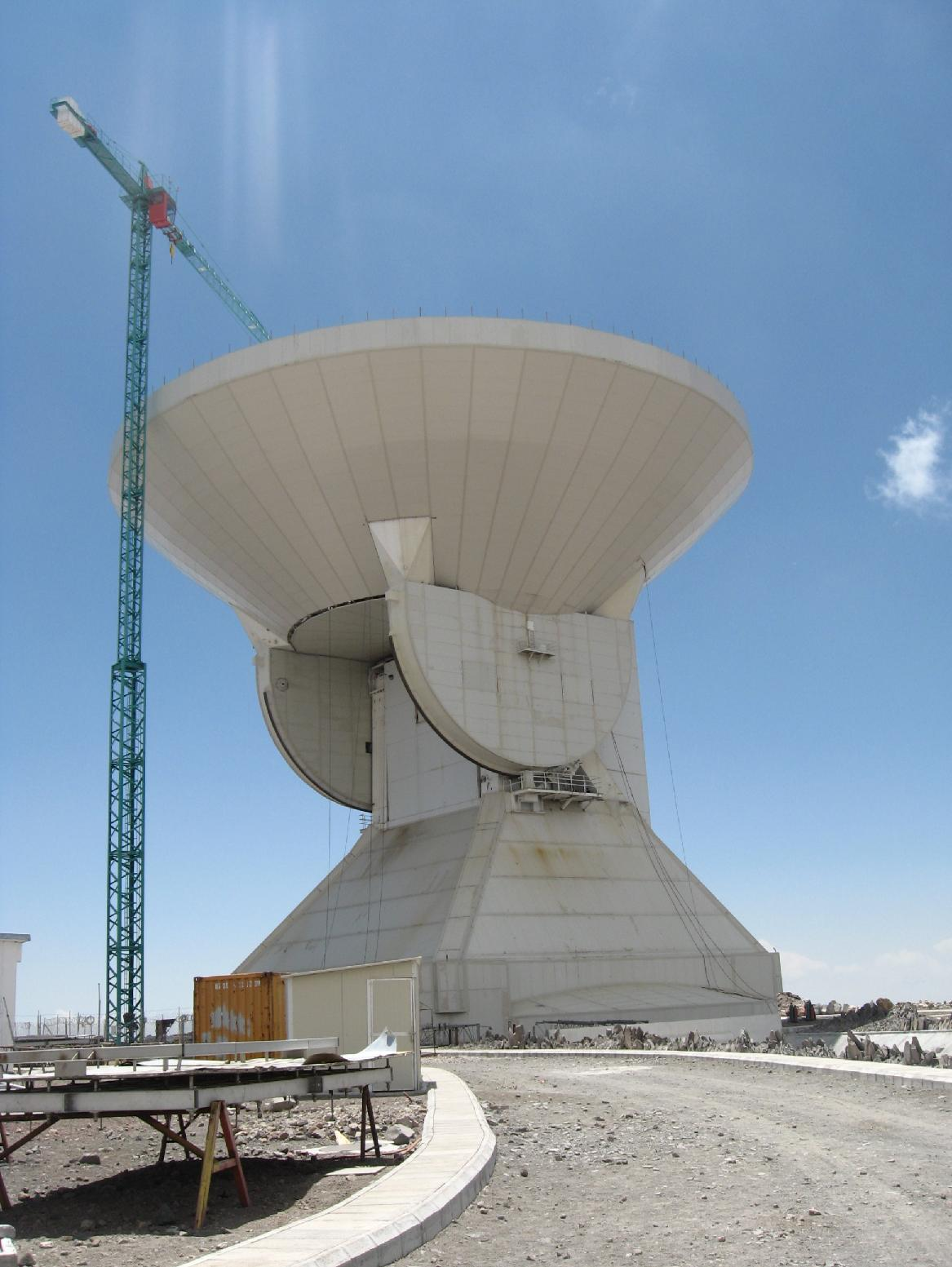
Large Millimeter Telescope in Puebla

The National Autonomous University of Mexico was officially established in 1910, and the university became one of the most important institutes of higher learning in Mexico. UNAM provides world class education in science, medicine, and engineering. Many scientific institutes and new institutes of higher learning, such as National Polytechnic Institute, were established during the first half of the 20th century. Most of the new research institutes were created within UNAM. Twelve institutes were integrated into UNAM from 1929 to 1973. In 1959, the Mexican Academy of Sciences was created to coordinate scientific efforts between academics.

In 1995, the Mexican chemist Mario J. Molina shared the Nobel Prize in Chemistry with Paul J. Crutzen and F. Sherwood Rowland for their work in atmospheric chemistry, particularly concerning the formation and decomposition of ozone. Molina, an alumnus of UNAM, became the first Mexican citizen to win the Nobel Prize in science.

The largest scientific project being developed in Mexico was the construction of the Large Millimeter Telescope (Gran Telescopio Milimétrico, GMT), the world's largest and most sensitive single-aperture telescope in its frequency range. It was designed to observe regions of space obscured by stellar dust. Mexico was ranked 58th in the Global Innovation Index in 2025.

=== Tourism ===
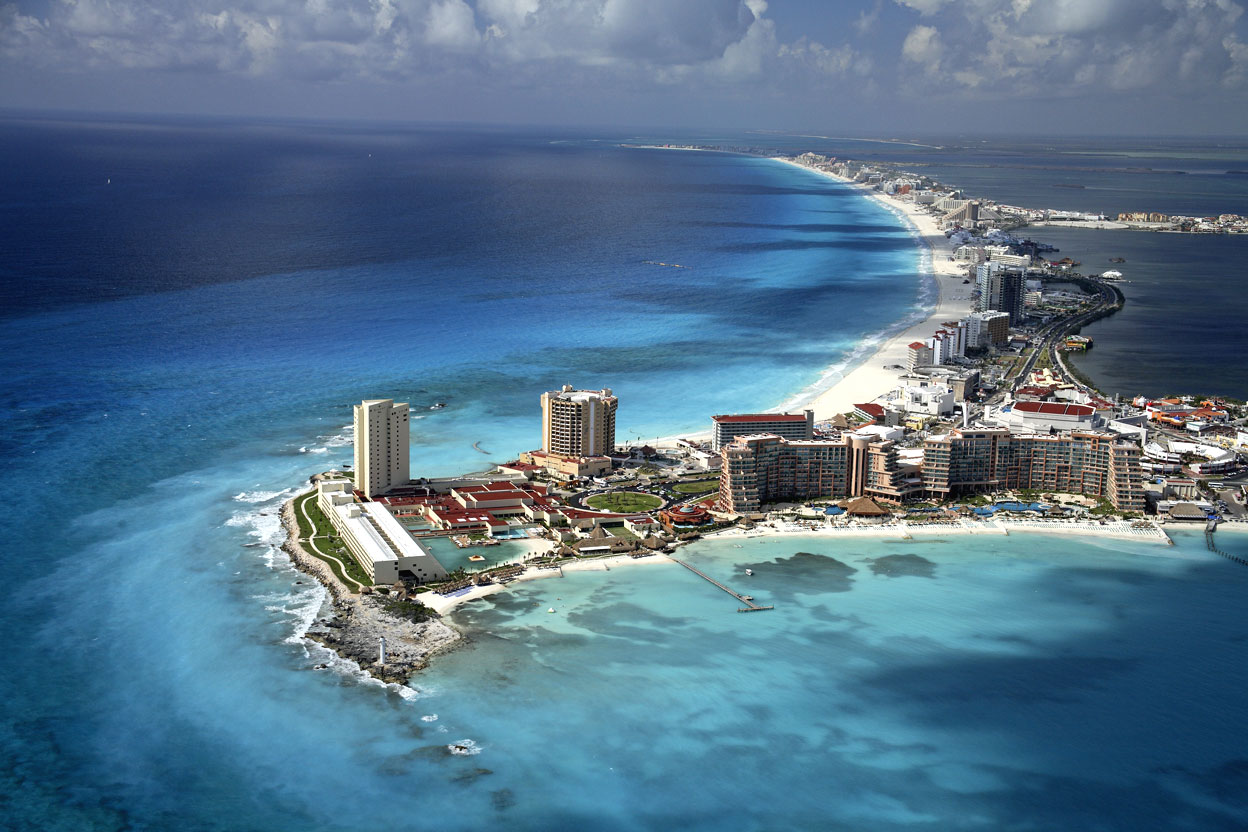
The resort town of Cancún, May 2008

As of 2017, Mexico was the 6th most visited country. It had the 15th highest income from tourism and highest in Latin America. The vast majority of tourists come from the US and Canada, followed by Europe and Asia. A smaller number come from other Latin American countries. In the 2017 Travel and Tourism Competitiveness Report, Mexico was ranked 22nd in the world, and 3rd in the Americas.

The coastlines are rich in sunny stretches of beach. According to the Constitution of Mexico Article 27, the entirety of the coastlines is under federal ownership. On the Yucatán peninsula, one of the most popular beach destinations is the resort town of Cancún, especially among university students during spring break. To the south of Cancun is the coastal strip called Riviera Maya which includes the beach town of Playa del Carmen and the ecological parks of Xcaret and Xel-Há. To the south of Cancún is the town of Tulum, notable for its ruins of Maya civilization. Other tourist destinations include Acapulco with crowded beaches and multi-story hotels on the shores. At the southern tip of the Baja California peninsula is the resort town of Cabo San Lucas, noted for its marlin fishing. Closer to the US border is the weekend draw of San Felipe, Baja California.

In Mexican cities along the Mexico–United States border, the most lucrative hospitality industry is now medical tourism, with remnants of the traditional motivations that drove tourists to Mexico's northern borderlands for nearly a century. Dominant medical tourism for tourism planning are the purchase of medication, dentistry, elective surgery, optometry, and chiropractic.

=== Transportation ===
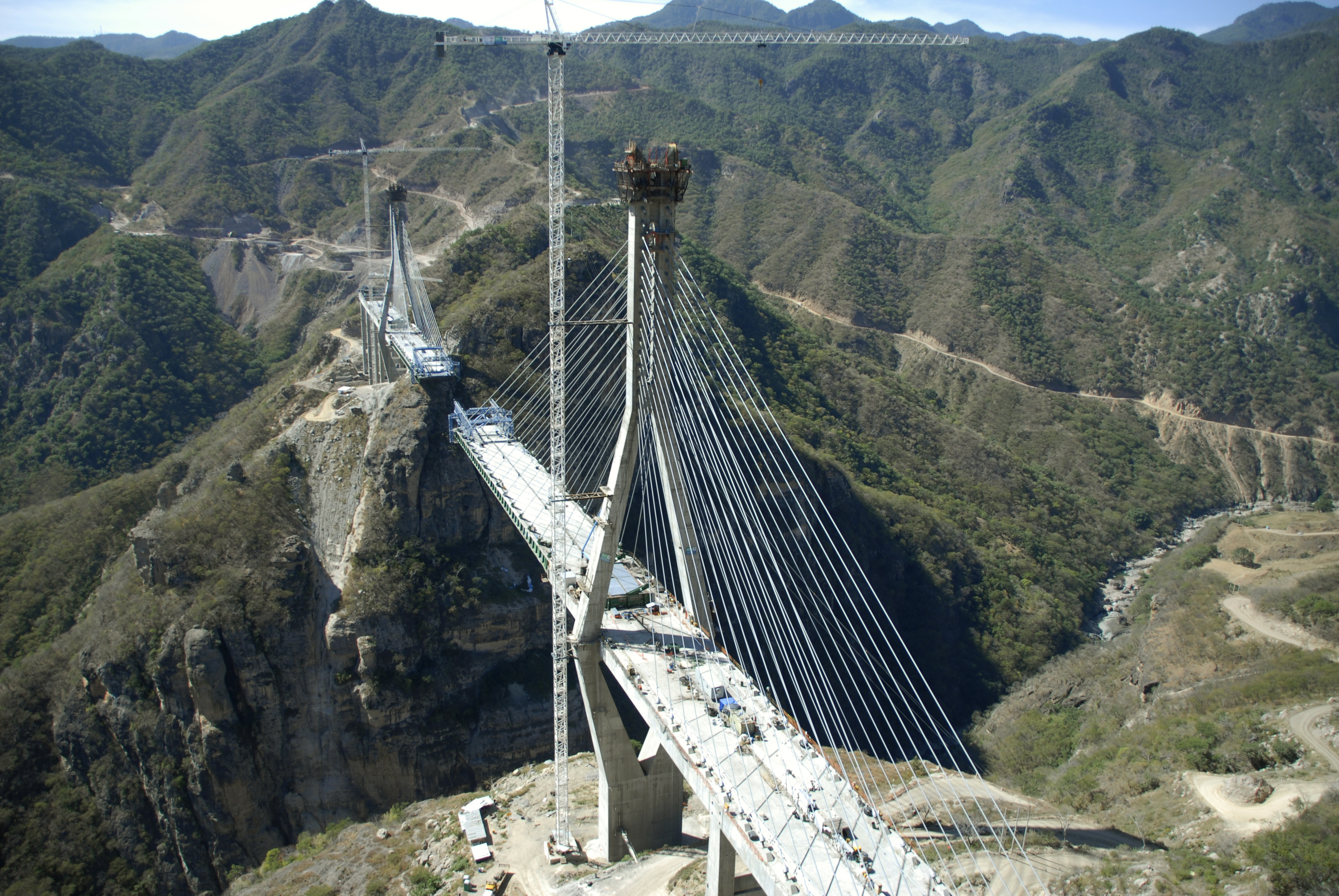
Baluarte Bridge, the highest bridge in the Americas

Despite its difficult topography, Mexico's roadway is extensive and most areas are covered. The road network has an extent of 366,095 km (227,481 mi), of which 116,802 km (72,577 mi) are paved, making it 9th largest of any country. Of these, 10,474 km (6,508 mi) are multi-lane expressways: 9,544 km (5,930 mi) are four-lane highways and the rest have 6 or more lanes.

Mexico was one of the first Latin American countries to promote railway development, and the network covers 30,952 km (19,233 mi). The Secretary of Communications and Transport of Mexico proposed a high-speed rail link that will transport its passengers from Mexico City to Guadalajara, Jalisco. The train, which will travel at 300 kilometers per hour (190 miles per hour), will allow passengers to travel from Mexico City to Guadalajara in just 2 hours. The whole project was projected to cost 240 billion pesos, or about 25 billion US$ and is being paid for jointly by the Mexican government and the local private sector including one of the wealthiest men in the world, Mexico's billionaire business tycoon Carlos Slim. The federal government has also been funding the construction of an inter city railway line connecting cities such as Cozumel, Mérida, Chichen Itza, Cancún and Palenque; another inter city train connecting the city of Toluca and Mexico City and has restored the Interoceanic train corridor, which connects the Pacific and Atlantic oceans.

Mexico has 233 airports with paved runways; of these, 10 carry 72% of national cargo and 97% of international cargo. The Mexico City International Airport remains the busiest in Latin America and the 36th busiest in the world transporting 45 million passengers a year. Two additional airports operate simultaneously to help relieve congestion from the Mexico City International Airport: the Toluca International Airport and the Felipe Ángeles International Airport.

== Demographics ==
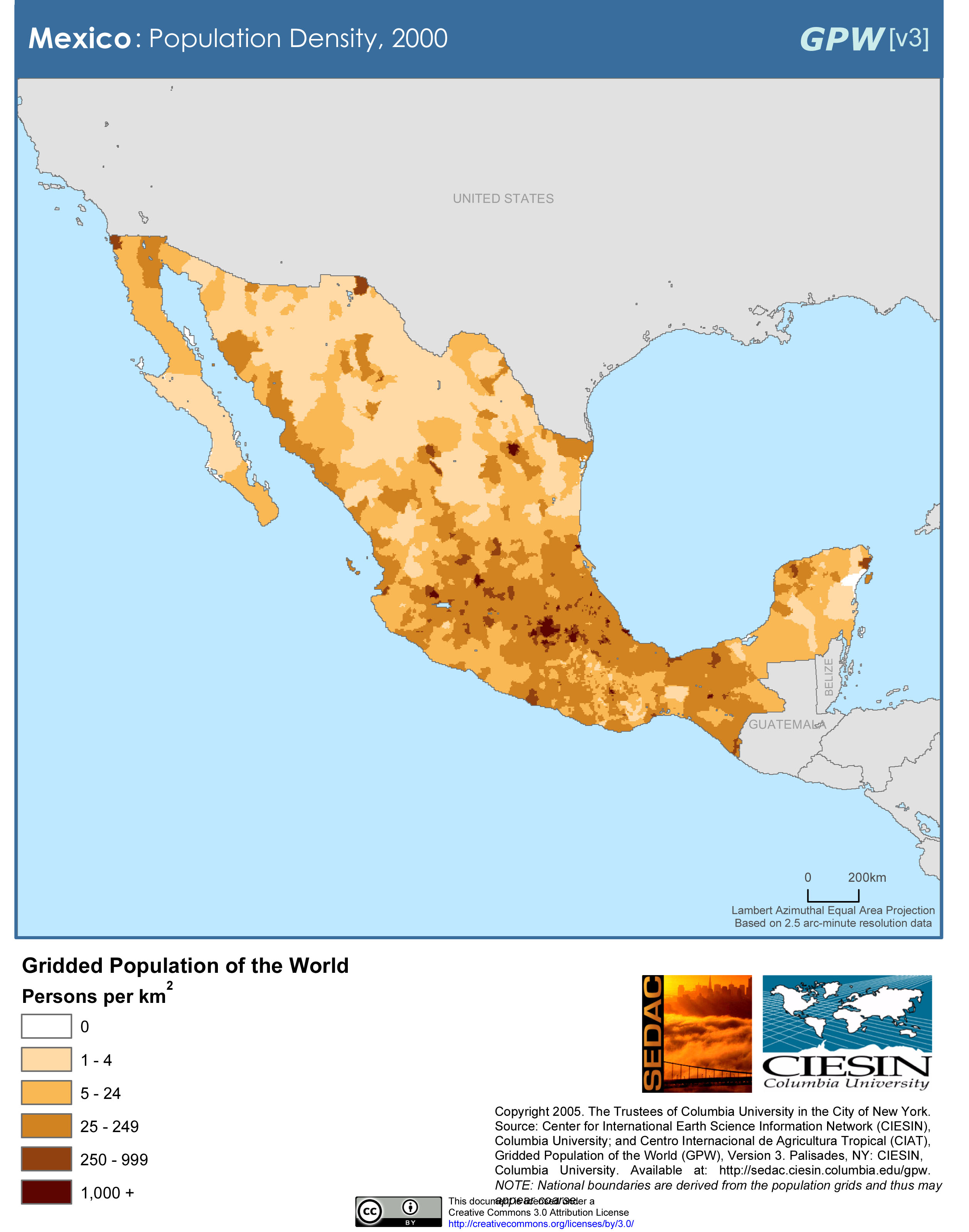
A map of Mexico's population density

As of 2026, Mexico's estimated population was 130,911,314 people, per the National Population Council. Since at least the 1970s, Mexico has been the most populous Spanish-speaking country in the world.

Throughout the 19th century, the population of Mexico barely doubled. This trend continued in the first two decades of the 20th century. In 1900, the Mexican population was a little more than 13 million. The Mexican Revolution (c. 1910–1920) greatly impacted population growth, with the 1921 census reporting a loss of about 1 million inhabitants.

The growth rate increased dramatically between the 1930s and the 1980s. Mexico had growth rates of over 3% between 1950 and 1980. The Mexican population doubled in twenty years, and at that rate, it was expected that by 2000 there would be 120 million people living in Mexico. Mexico's population grew from 70 million in 1982 to 123.5 million inhabitants in 2017. Life expectancy increased from 36 years in 1895, to 75 years in 2020.

=== Urban areas ===
In 2020, there were 48 metropolitan areas in Mexico, in which close to 53% of Mexico's population lives. The most populous metropolitan area in Mexico is the Metropolitan Area of the Valley of Mexico, or Greater Mexico City, which in 2020 had a population of 21.8 million, or around 18% of the nation's population. The next four largest metropolitan areas are Greater Monterrey (5.3 million), Greater Guadalajara (5.2 million), Greater Puebla (3.2 million) and Greater Toluca (2.3 million). Urban areas contain 76.81% of Mexico's population.

Largest metropolitan areas in Mexico 2020 National Population Census
Rank	Name	State	Pop.	Rank	Name	State	Pop.
1	Valley of Mexico	Mexico City, State of Mexico, Hidalgo	21,804,515	11	Aguascalientes	Aguascalientes	1,225,432
2	Monterrey	Nuevo León	5,341,171	12	San Luis Potosí	San Luis Potosí	1,221,526
3	Guadalajara	Jalisco	5,286,642	13	Mérida	Yucatán	1,201,000
4	Puebla–Tlaxcala	Puebla, Tlaxcala	3,199,530	14	Mexicali	Baja California	1,049,792
5	Toluca	State of Mexico	2,353,924	15	Saltillo	Coahuila	1,031,779
6	Tijuana	Baja California	2,157,853	16	Cuernavaca	Morelos	1,028,589
7	León	Guanajuato	1,924,771	17	Culiacán	Sinaloa	1,003,530
8	Querétaro	Querétaro	1,594,212	18	Morelia	Michoacán	988,704
9	Juárez	Chihuahua	1,512,450	19	Chihuahua	Chihuahua	988,065
10	La Laguna	Coahuila, Durango	1,434,283	20	Veracruz	Veracruz	939,046

=== Ethnicity and race ===
Mexico's population is diverse, and ethnic research has historically felt the impact of nationalist discourses on identity. Social stratification and racism in Mexico have remained in the contemporary era. Although phenotype is not as important as culture, European features and lighter skin tone are favored by middle- and upper-class groups.

Starting with the Royal Decree of 1503 and the Laws of Burgos of 1512, the Spanish crown influenced by the School of Salamanca recognized the freedom of the indigenous peoples of the Americas, while simultaneously importing African slaves. Indian republics were granted some degree of autonomy, and full assimilation of Spaniards and Indians was ordained. In practice, the Spanish often occupied the administrative positions, and maintained a fluid and complicated caste-like system which favored Europeans over other groups. This social stratification offered some degree of social mobility, as Afro-Mexicans and indigenous people assimilated to the mestizo (mixed) caste, and even pure Spaniards could also fall off the economic ladder. Slavery was abolished twice by the insurgent movements of Hidalgo and Morelos in 1810, and again by the independent government of Vicente Guerrero in 1829, an Afro-Mexican.

After Mexico gained independence from Spain in 1821, any traces of the colonial caste system were abandoned, with race being omitted from public documents. Near the end of the 1800s, the government led by Porfirio Díaz adopted policies of selective immigration from Europe and persecuted certain indigenous groups, as it was believed it would help to modernize the country.

After the Mexican Revolution and during the 1930s, in an attempt to unify the country under a single national identity, Mexico's government promoted the views of academics such as José Vasconcelos, who asserted that all Mexicans belonged to a mixed race, being distinguished only culturally by residence in or outside of an indigenous community, degree of fluency in an indigenous language, and degree of adherence to indigenous customs. While people of mixed ancestry form the most prominent ethnic group in contemporary Mexico, the subjective and ever-changing definition of this category means that precise estimates are impossible.

During Mexican Revolution, and again during the Cárdenas presidency, government efforts were made to decrease social and economic inequality among indigenous Mexicans. In 1992, the Article 2 of the Constitution of Mexico was amended to define Mexico as a pluricultural country and specifically to emphasize the role of indigenous Mexicans. This new legal framework preceded the Zapatista Army of National Liberation's push against the mestizaje ideology that led to the 1996 San Andrés Accords which granted autonomy, recognition, and rights to the indigenous population of Mexico.

At Mexico's 2020 census, 19.4% of the population identified as indigenous and 6.1% of Mexico's population speaks an Indigenous language. Since the 1960s there has been a cultural and academic re-evaluation of the role of Afro-Mexicans in Mexico, dispelling the misconception that they had assimilated into the mestizo identity. At the 2020 census, Afro-Mexicans were 2.04% of Mexico's population. In 2020, Asians and Middle Easterners were around 1% of the population each.

=== Emigration and immigration ===
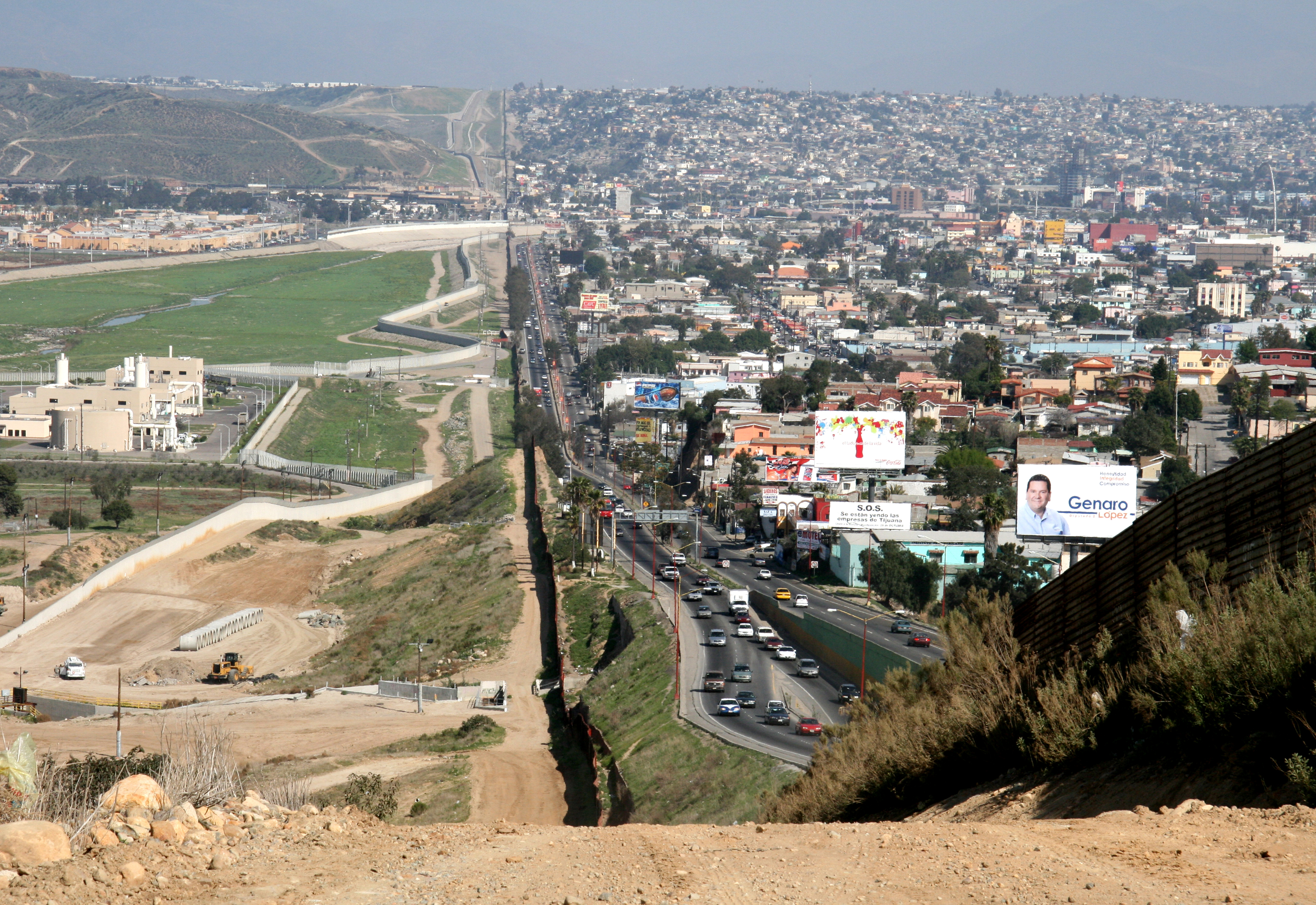
The Mexico–United States barrier between San Diego's border patrol offices in California, US (left) and Tijuana, Mexico (right)

In 2019, an estimated 11.7 million Mexicans lived outside Mexico, in addition to 13.5 million born abroad and another 12 million descendants. The vast majority of this combined population (98–99%) are in the U.S. The largest Mexican communities outside Mexico are in the metropolitan areas of Los Angeles, Chicago, Houston and Dallas–Fort Worth. Between 1965 and 2015, more than 16 million Mexicans migrated to the United States alone—by far the top destination for both temporary and permanent migration—representing one of the largest mass migrations in modern history. As a result of these major migration flows in recent decades, an estimated 37.2 million U.S. residents, or 11.2% of the US population, identified as being of full or partial Mexican ancestry.

In 2018, among the remaining 2% of Mexican expatriates not residing in the U.S., the most popular destinations are Canada (86,780), primarily the provinces of Ontario and Quebec, followed by Spain and Germany. The latter two countries account for two-thirds of all Mexicans living in Europe. In 2018, it was estimated that 69,000 Mexicans live in Latin America, led by Guatemala (18,870) followed by Bolivia (10,610), Chile (10,560), and Panama (5,000).

Historically, and relative to other countries in the Western Hemisphere, Mexico has not been a destination of mass migration. In 2020, an estimated 1.2 million foreigners settled in Mexico, up from nearly 1 million in 2010. In 2021, Mexico officially received 68,000 new immigrants, a 16% increase from the prior year. The overall number of migrants, including those unauthorized to enter or stay in the country, may be higher than official figures.

The vast majority of migrants in Mexico come from the United States (900,000), making Mexico the top destination for U.S. citizens abroad. The second largest group comes from neighboring Guatemala (54,500), followed by Spain (27,600). Other major sources of migration are fellow Latin American countries, which include Colombia (20,600), Argentina (19,200) and Cuba (18,100). Communities descended from the Lebanese diaspora and German-born Mennonites have had an outsized impact in Mexico's culture, particularly in its cuisine and traditional music.

=== Languages ===
Spanish is the de facto national language spoken by the vast majority of the population, making Mexico the world's most populous Hispanophone country. Mexican Spanish refers to the varieties of Spanish spoken in Mexico, which differs from one region to another in sound, structure, and vocabulary.

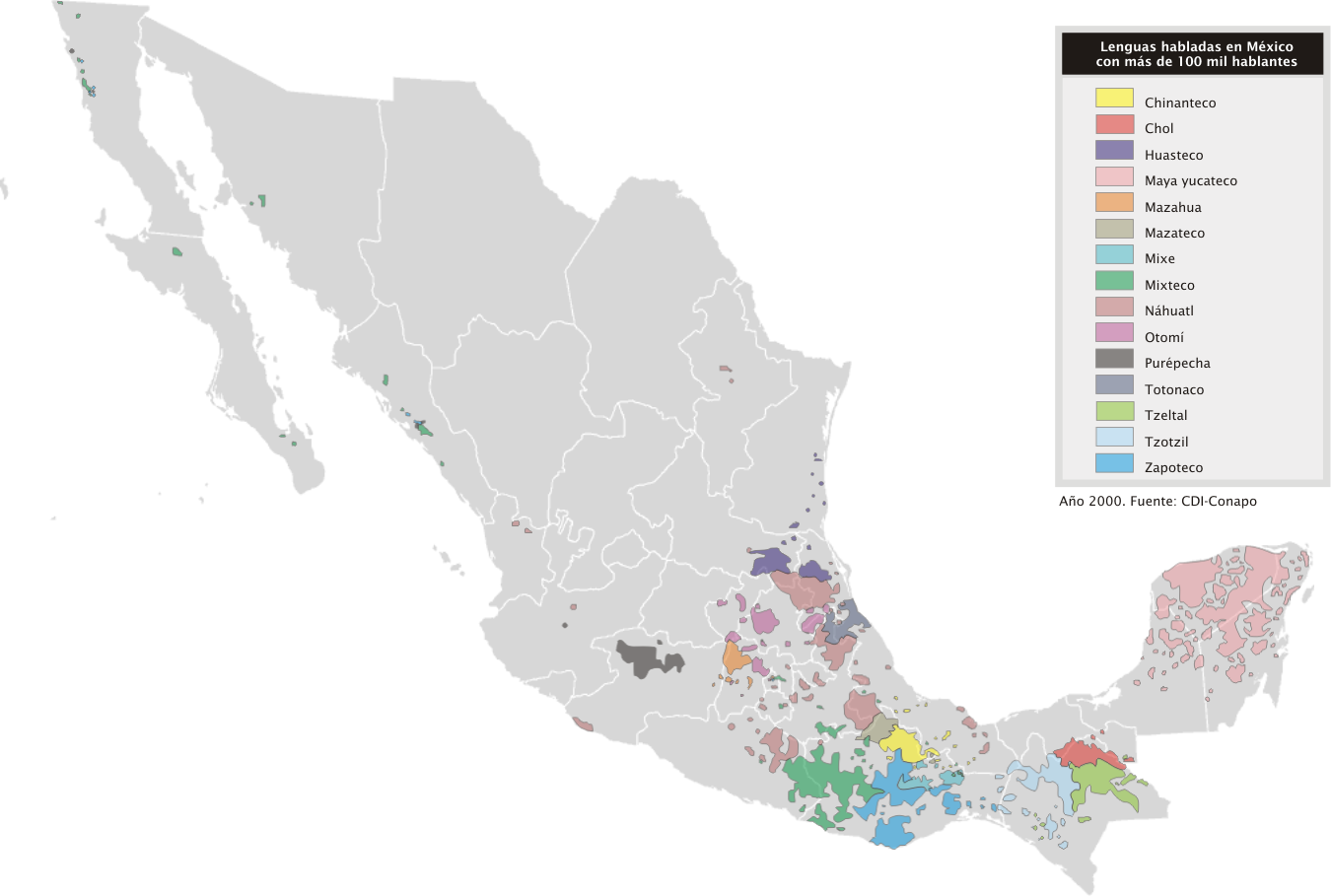
The distribution of indigenous languages in Mexico, with more than 100,000 speakers

The federal government recognizes sixty-eight linguistic groups and 364 varieties of indigenous languages. In 2015, an estimated 8.3 million citizens spoke these languages. Nahuatl is spoken by more than 1.7 million, followed by Yucatec Maya, used daily by nearly 850,000 people. Tzeltal and Tzotzil, two other Mayan languages, are spoken by around half a million people each, primarily in the southern state of Chiapas. Mixtec and Zapotec, with an estimated 500,000 native speakers each, are two other prominent language groups.

Since its creation in March 2003, the National Indigenous Languages Institute has been in charge of promoting and protecting the use of Mexico's indigenous languages, through the General Law on the Linguistic Rights of Indigenous Peoples, which recognizes them de jure as "national languages" with status equal to that of Spanish. That notwithstanding, in practice, indigenous peoples often face discrimination and do not have full access to public services such as education and healthcare, or to the justice system, as Spanish is the prevailing language.

Aside from indigenous languages, there are several minority languages spoken in Mexico due to international migration, such as Plautdietsch by the 80,000-strong Mennonite population, primarily settled in the northern states, fueled by the tolerance of the federal government towards this community by allowing them to set their educational system compatible with their customs and traditions. The Chipilo dialect, a variant of the Venetian language, is spoken in the town of Chipilo, located in the central state of Puebla, by around 2,500 people, mainly descendants of Venetians that migrated to the area in the late 19th century.

English is the most commonly taught foreign language in Mexico. It is estimated that nearly 24 million, or around a fifth of the population, study English through public schools, private institutions, or self-access channels. However, in 2015, a high level of English proficiency was limited to 5% of the population. French is the second most widely taught foreign language. Every year, between 200,000 and 250,000 Mexican students enroll in French language courses.

=== Religion ===
Religion in Mexico, 2020 census.
1. Catholicism (77.8%)
2. Protestantism (11.2%)
3. Unaffiliated (2.50%)
4. Other religions (0.20%)
5. No religion (8.10%)

Although the Constitutions of 1857 and 1917 put limits on the role of the Catholic Church in Mexico, Catholicism remains Mexico's dominant religious affiliation. In the 2020 census, 77.8% (97,864,218) of the population were Catholic. 11.2% (14,095,307) belong to Protestant/Evangelical Christian denominations—including Other Christians (6,778,435), Evangelicals (2,387,133), Pentecostals (1,179,415), Jehovah's Witnesses (1,530,909), Seventh-day Adventists (791,109), and members of the Church of Jesus Christ of Latter-day Saints (337,998). 8.1% (9,488,671) of the population declared having no religion. 0.4% (491,814) were unspecified.

The 97,864,218 Catholics of Mexico constitute in absolute terms the second largest Catholic community in the world, after Brazil's. In 1997, 47% percent of them attended church services weekly. Pentecostalism is the second Christian creed in Mexico, with more than 1.3 million adherents. Migratory phenomena have led to the spread of different aspects of Christianity, including branches Protestants, Eastern Catholic Churches and Eastern Orthodox Church.

In the 2020 census, there were 58,876 Jews in Mexico. The presence of Jews in Mexico dates back to the 16th century when Spaniards arrived in the Americas. The modern Jewish Community began to be formed in the late 19th and early 20th century when Jews from Europe and the Ottoman Empire immigrated to Mexico due to instability and antisemitism. Islam in Mexico, with 7,982 members, is practiced mostly by Arab Mexicans. In the 2020 census, 36,764 Mexicans belonged to a spiritualist religion, a category which includes a tiny Buddhist population. About 74,000 people practiced religions with "ethnic roots", religions of mostly African and indigenous origin.

There is often a syncretism between shamanism and Catholic traditions. Another religion of popular syncretism in Mexico, especially in recent years, is Santería, mainly due to the large number of Cubans who settled in Mexico after the Cuban Revolution. One of the most exemplary cases of popular religiosity is the cult of Holy Dead (Santa Muerte). Other examples are the representations of the Passion of Christ and the celebration of Day of the Dead, which take place within the framework of the Catholic Christian imagery, but under a very particular reinterpretation.

=== Education ===
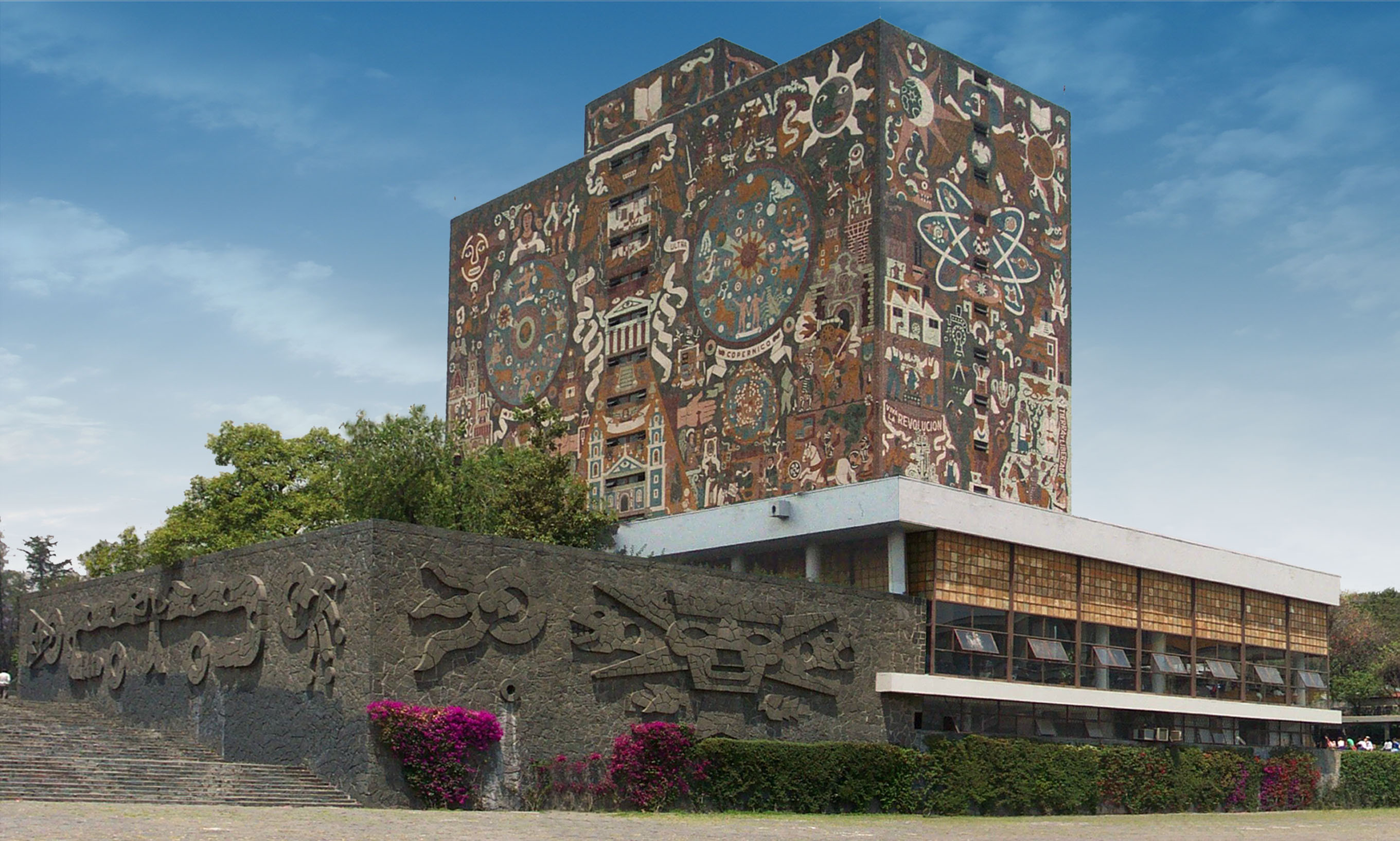
The Central Library of the National Autonomous University of Mexico

In 2020, the literacy rate in Mexico was 95.25%, a slight increase from 94.86% in 2018, and significantly higher than 82.99% in 1980. Literacy between males and females is relatively equal.

According to most rankings, the publicly funded National Autonomous University of Mexico (UNAM) is the best university in the country. Other prominent public universities include the National Polytechnic Institute, the Metropolitan Autonomous University, the University of Guadalajara and the Autonomous University of Nuevo León and El Colegio de México.

In terms of private academic institutions, among the most highly ranked is the Monterrey Institute of Technology and Higher Education. Other prominent private universities include Universidad Iberoamericana, Universidad Panamericana, ITAM and Universidad Anáhuac.

=== Health ===
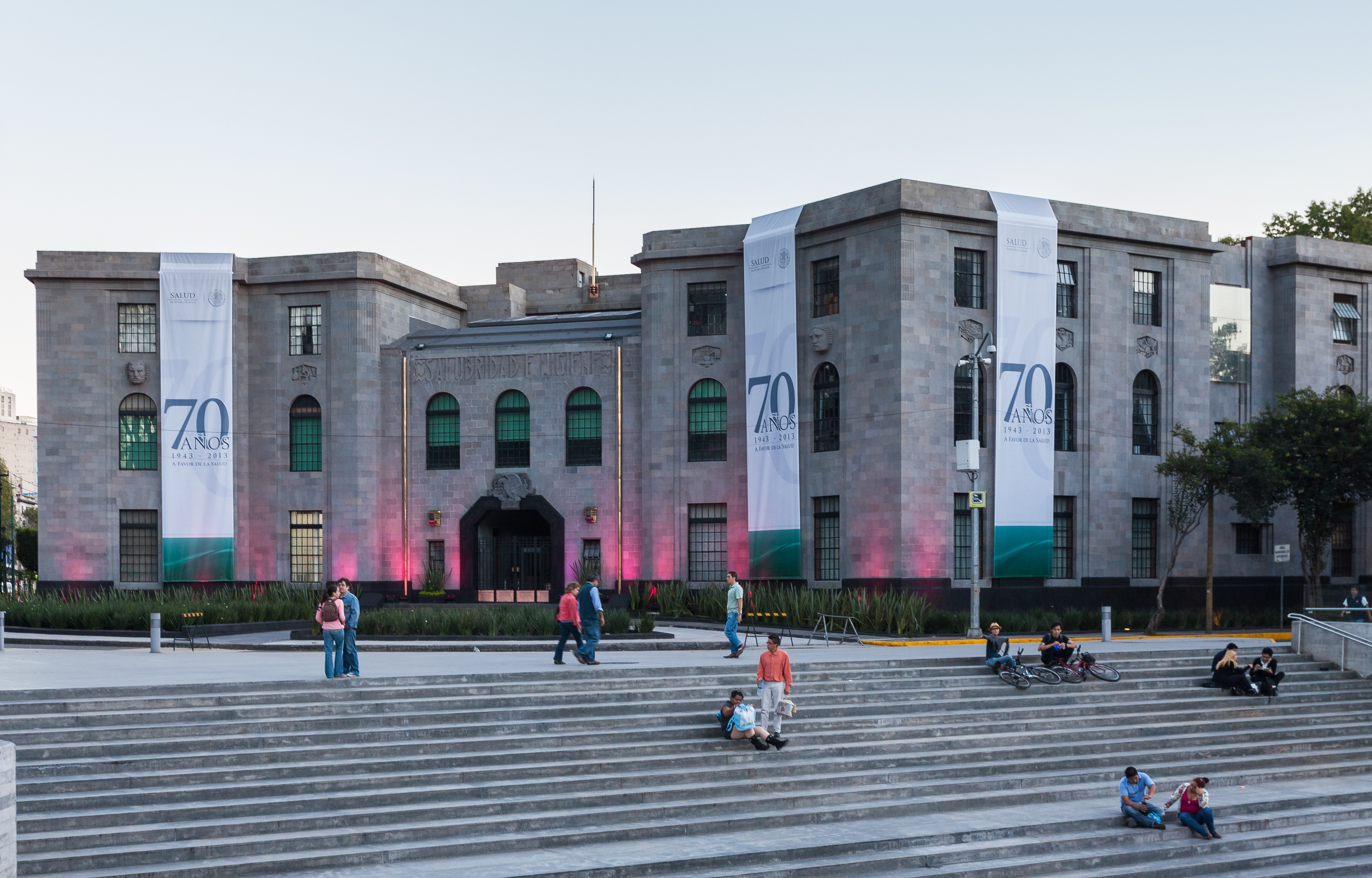
The Secretariat of Health, Mexico City, Mexico

In the 1930s, Mexico made a commitment to rural health care, mandating that mostly urban medical students receive training in it and to make them agents of the state to assess marginal areas. Since the early 1990s, Mexico entered a transitional stage in the health of its population and some indicators such as mortality patterns are identical to those found in highly developed countries like Germany or Japan. Mexico's medical infrastructure is highly rated for the most part and is usually excellent in major cities. Rural communities still lack equipment for advanced medical procedures, forcing patients in those locations to travel to the closest urban areas to get specialized medical care. Social determinants of health can be used to evaluate the state of health in Mexico.

State-funded institutions such as Mexican Social Security Institute (IMSS) and the Institute for Social Security and Services for State Workers (ISSSTE) play a major role in health and social security. Private health services are also very important and account for 13% of all medical units in the country. Medical training is done mostly at public universities, with many specializations done in vocational or internship settings. Some public universities in Mexico, such as the University of Guadalajara, have signed agreements with the U.S. to receive and train American students in medicine. Health care costs in private institutions and prescription drugs in Mexico are on average lower than that of its North American economic partners.

== Culture ==
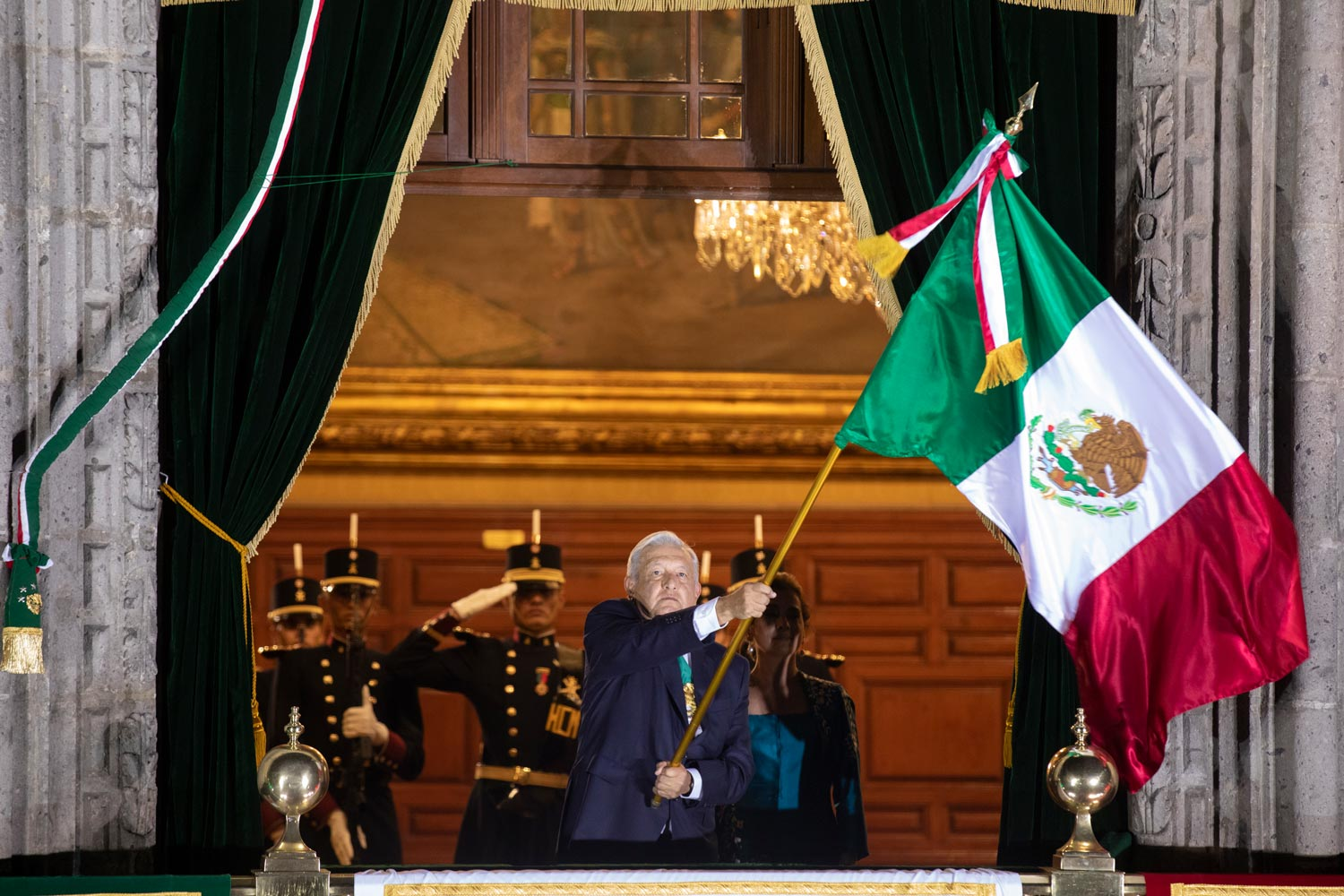
The Cry of Dolores. Every year on the eve of Independence Day, the President of Mexico re-enacts the cry from the balcony of the National Palace in Mexico City

Mexican culture reflects a long and complex history of interactions between various peoples through migration, conquest, and trade. Three centuries of Spanish rule resulted in the blending of Spanish culture with those of different indigenous groups. Efforts to assimilate the native population into Christian European culture during the colonial era were only partially successful, with many pre-Columbian customs, traditions, and norms persisting regionally (particularly in rural areas) or becoming syncretized; conversely, many Spanish settlers integrated into local communities through acculturation or intermarriage. However, a high degree of stratification along the lines of class, ethnicity, and race perpetuated distinct subcultures.

The Porfirian era (el Porfiriato) (1876–1911), which brought relative peace after four decades of civil unrest and war, saw the development of philosophy and art, often with government support. Since that time, as accentuated during the Mexican Revolution, the government adopted and promoted the mestizo ideology to create a unified Mexican identity, characterized by the blending of different races and cultures.

In light of the ethnicities that formed the Mexican people, José Vasconcelos in La Raza Cósmica (The Cosmic Race) (1925) defined Mexico and Latin America to be the melting pot of all races (thus extending the definition of the mestizo) not only biologically but culturally as well. Other Mexican intellectuals grappled with the idea of Lo Mexicano, which seeks "to discover the national ethos of Mexican culture." Nobel laureate Octavio Paz explores the notion of a Mexican national character in The Labyrinth of Solitude.

=== Art ===
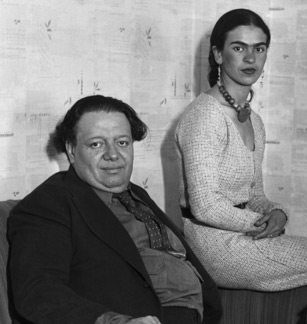
Diego Rivera and Frida Kahlo, two of the most famous Mexican artists

Painting is one of the oldest arts in Mexico. Cave painting in Mexican territory is about 7,500 years old and has been found in the caves of the Baja California Peninsula. Pre-Columbian Mexican art is present in buildings and caves, in Aztec codices, in ceramics, in garments, etc.; examples of this are the Maya mural paintings of Bonampak or the murals found in Teotihuacán, Cacaxtla and Monte Albán. Mural painting with Christian religious themes had an important flowering during the 16th century, early colonial era in newly constructed churches and monasteries. Examples can be found in Acolman, Actopan, Huejotzingo, Tecamachalco and Zinacantepec.

As with most art during the early modern era in the West, colonial-era Mexican art was religious during the sixteenth and seventeenth centuries. Starting in the late seventeenth century, and, most prominently in the eighteenth century, secular portraits and images of racial types, so-called casta painting appeared. Important painters of the late colonial period were Juan Correa, Cristóbal de Villalpando and Miguel Cabrera. In early post-independence Mexico, nineteenth-century painting had a marked romantic influence; landscapes and portraits were the greatest expressions of this era. Hermenegildo Bustos is one of the most appreciated painters of the historiography of Mexican art. Other painters include Santiago Rebull, Félix Parra, Eugenio Landesio, and his noted pupil, the landscape artist José María Velasco.

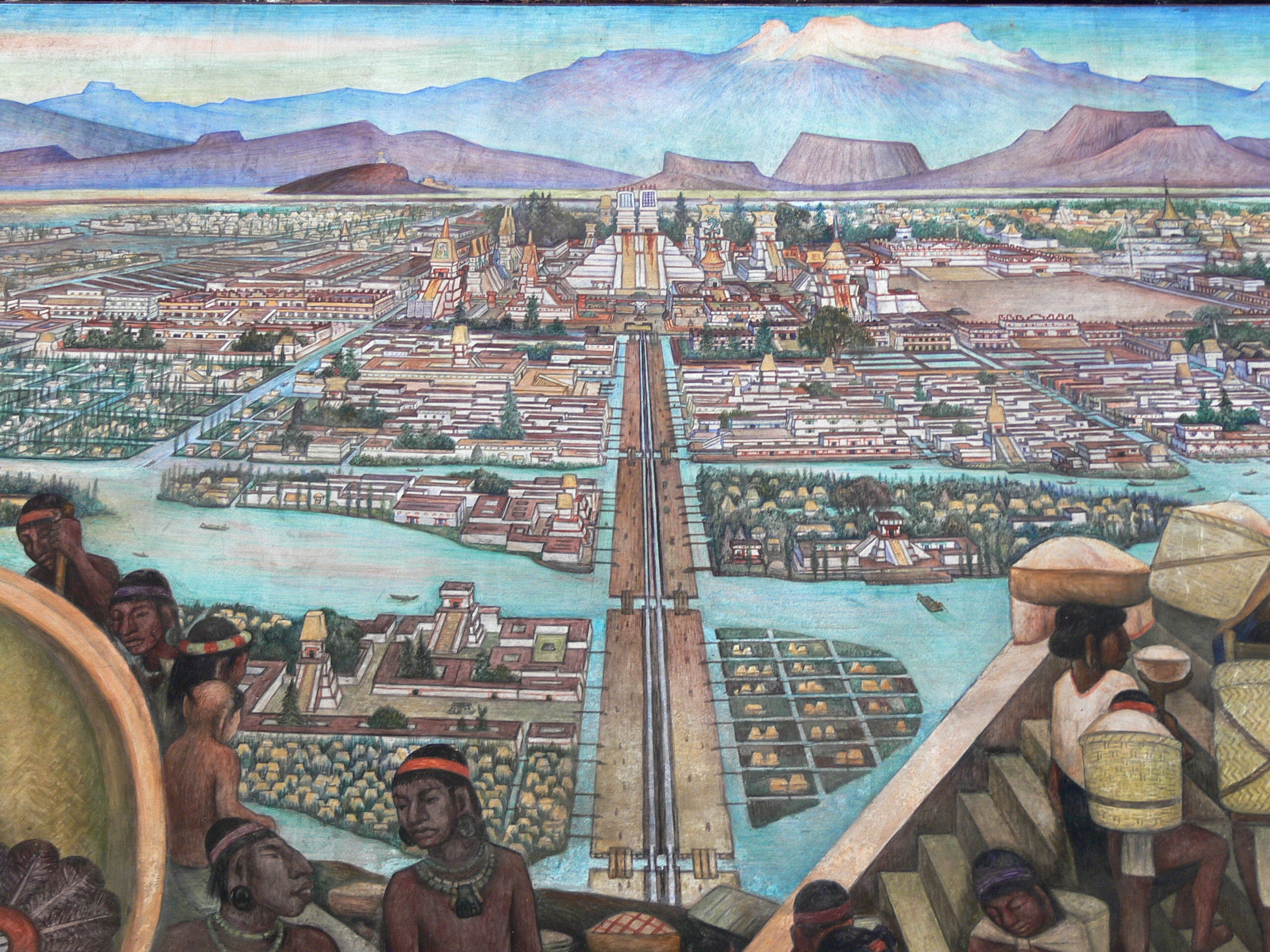
A mural by Diego Rivera showing the pre-Columbian Aztec city of Tenochtitlan. In the Palacio Nacional in Mexico City

In the 20th century artists such as Diego Rivera, David Alfaro Siqueiros, and José Clemente Orozco, the so-called "Big Three" of Mexican muralism achieved worldwide recognition. They were commissioned by the Mexican government to paint large-scale historical murals on the walls of public buildings, which helped shape popular perceptions of the Mexican Revolution and Mexican cultural identity. Frida Kahlo's largely personal portraiture is considered by many as the most important historical work by a female artist.

In the 21st century, Mexico City became home to the highest concentration of art museums in the world. Institutions like the Museo Jumex, the largest collection of its kind, founded by collector Eugenio López Alonso and bolstered by art advisor Esthella Provas, changed the notion of contemporary art in Latin America. The Museo Tamayo Arte Contemporaneous founded by Rufino Tamayo is also considered a preeminent institution and introduced foreign artists to a wider population. The country is also an epicenter for International art galleries including Kurimanzutto and FF Projects, and leading artists including Gabriel Orozco, Bosco Sodi, Stefan Brüggemann, and Mario García Torres.

=== Architecture ===
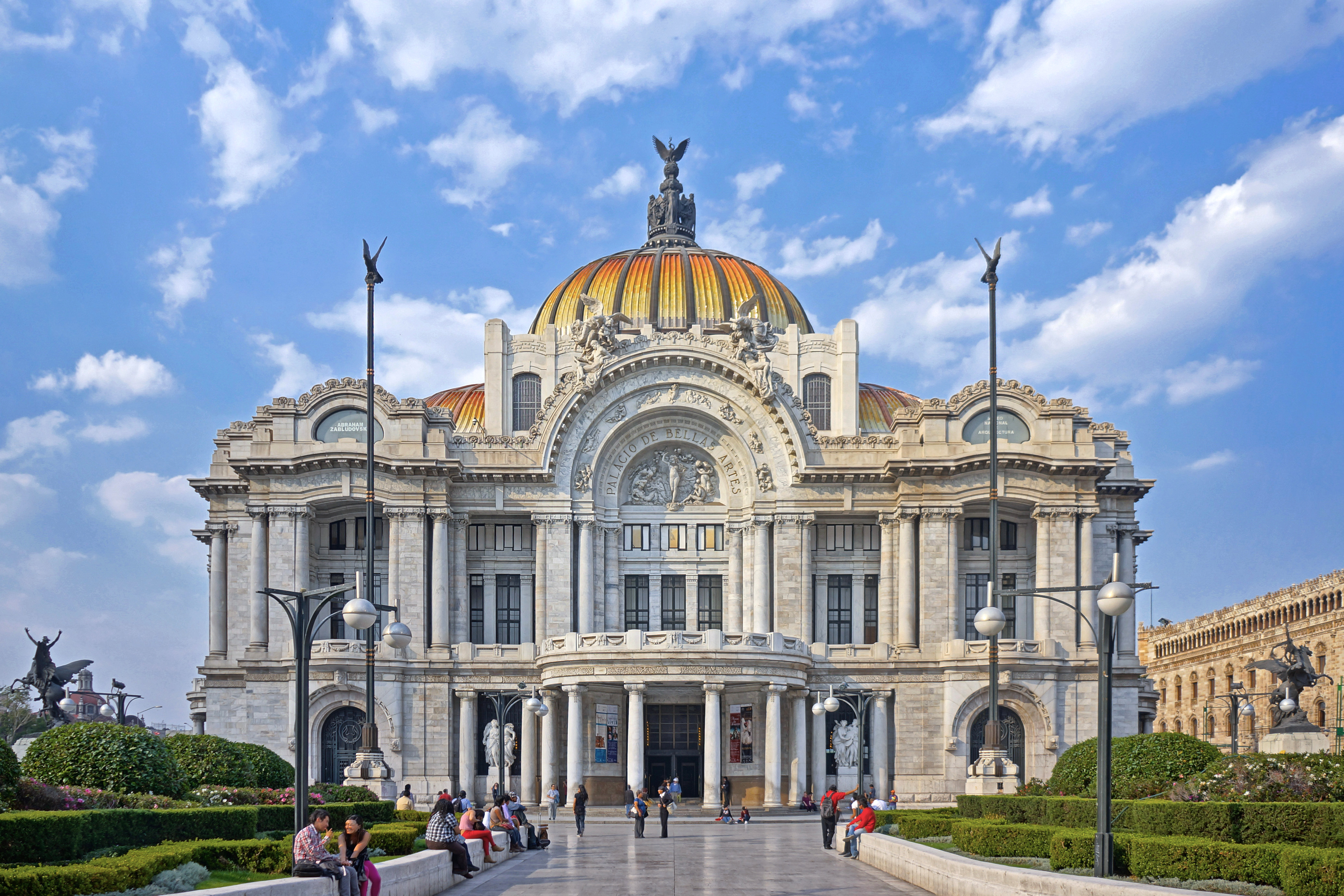
The Palacio de Bellas Artes (Palace of Fine Arts), with murals, artworks and a major performance space

The architecture of Mesoamerican civilizations evolved in style from simple to complex. Teotihuacan, designated a UNESCO World Heritage Site in 1987, is one of the foremost examples of ancient pyramid construction. The cities of the Maya stand out to modern architects as examples of integration between large urban centers (with elaborate stone construction) and a thick jungle, generally with a complex network of roads. Pre-Columbian Mesoamerica also saw distinctive architectural influences from the Olmec, the Puuc and oasiamerican peoples.

With the arrival of the Spanish, architectural theories of the Greco-Latin order with Arab influences were introduced. In the first few decades of Spanish presence in the continent, the high level of Christian missionary activity, especially by mendicant orders like the Dominicans or Franciscans, meant the construction of many monasteries, often with Romanesque, Gothic or Mudéjar elements. The interaction between Spaniards and Indigenous people gave rise to artistic styles such as the tequitqui, from the Nahuatl term for worker or builder.

Years later, Baroque and Mannerist styles prevailed in large cathedrals and civil buildings. In rural areas, haciendas or stately estates with Mozarabic tendencies were built. In the 19th century, the neoclassical movement arose as the country gained independence and sought to establish itself as a republic. A famous example is the Hospicio Cabañas, an orphanage and hospital complex completed in 1829. The art nouveau, and the art deco were styles introduced into the design of the Palacio de Bellas Artes to mark the identity of the Mexican nation with Greek-Roman and pre-Columbian symbols.

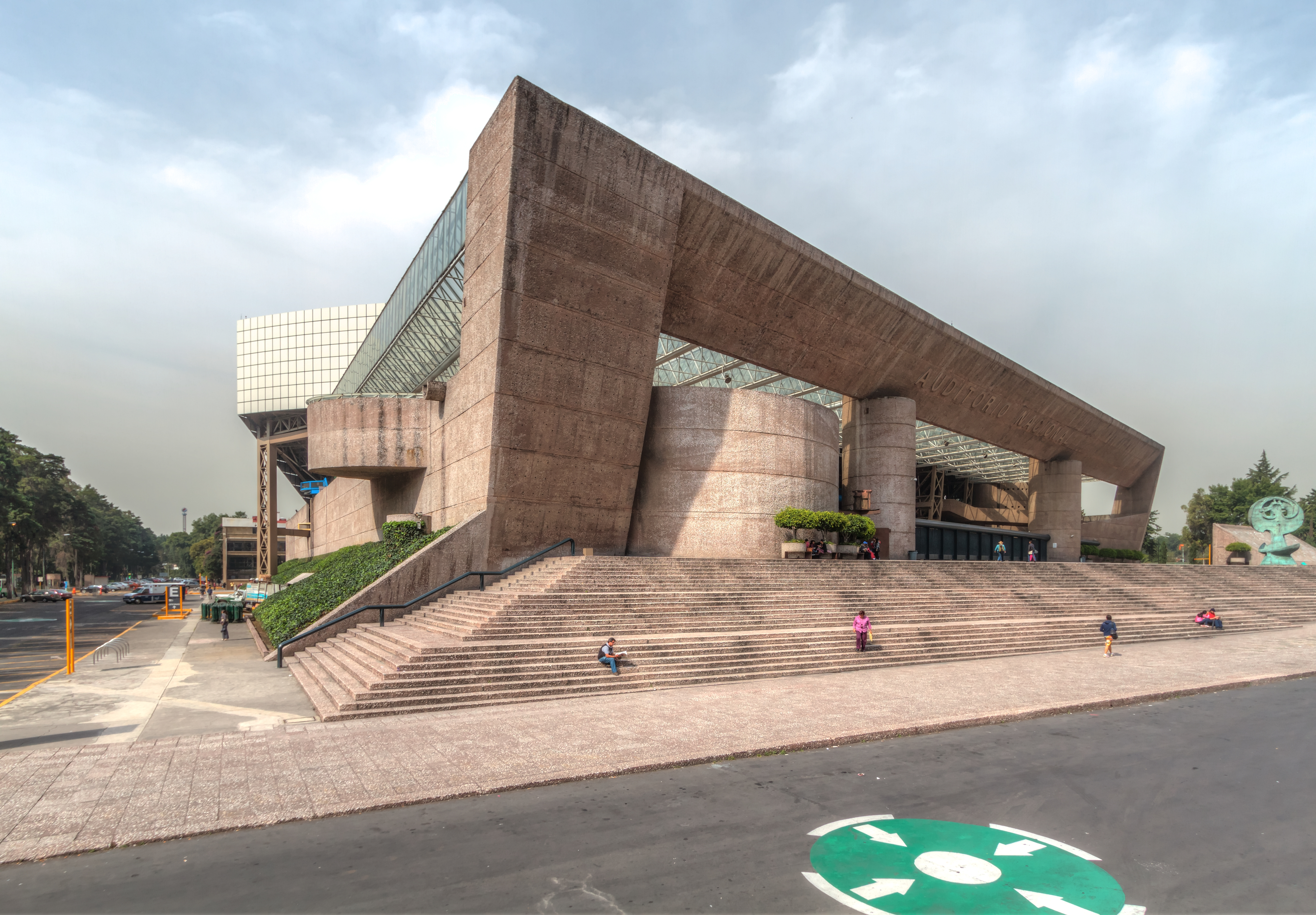
The National Auditorium

As a new sense of nationalism developed in the 20th century, a strengthened central government issued formal policies that sought to use architecture to show Mexico's modernity and differentiation from other nations. The development of Mexican modernist architecture was especially manifested in the mid-1950s construction of the Ciudad Universitaria, Mexico City, the main campus of the National Autonomous University of Mexico. Designed by the most prestigious architects of the era, including Mario Pani, Eugenio Peschard, and Enrique del Moral, the buildings feature murals by artists Diego Rivera, David Alfaro Siqueiros, and José Chávez Morado. It has since been recognized as a UNESCO World Heritage Site.

Juan O'Gorman was one of the first environmental architects in modern Mexico to develop the "organic" theory, trying to integrate buildings onto the landscape within the same approaches of Frank Lloyd Wright. In the search for a new architecture that does not resemble the styles of the past, it achieves a joint manifestation with the mural painting and the landscaping. Luis Barragán combined the shape of the space with forms of rural vernacular architecture of Mexico and Mediterranean countries (Spain-Morocco), integrating color that handles light and shade in different tones and opens a look at the international minimalism. He won the 1980 Pritzker Prize, the highest award in architecture.

=== Literature ===
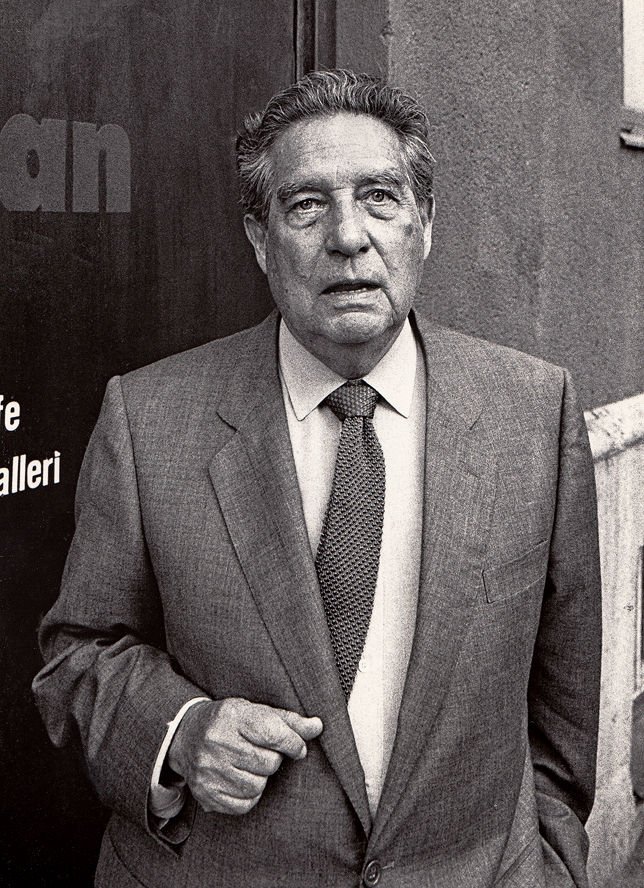
Octavio Paz, the only Mexican awarded with the Nobel Prize in Literature

Mexican literature has its antecedents in the literature of the indigenous settlements of Mesoamerica. Poetry had a rich cultural tradition in pre-Columbian Mexico, being divided into two broad categories—secular and religious. Aztec poetry was sung, chanted, or spoken, often to the accompaniment of a drum or a harp. While Tenochtitlan was the political capital, Texcoco was the cultural center; the Texcocan language was considered the most melodious and refined. The best well-known pre-Columbian poet is Nezahualcoyotl.

There are historical chronicles of the conquest of the Aztec Empire by participants, and, later, by historians. Bernal Díaz del Castillo's True History of the Conquest of the New Spain is still widely read today. Spanish-born poet Bernardo de Balbuena extolled the virtues of Mexico in Grandeza mexicana (Mexican Grandeur) (1604). Baroque literature flourished in the 17th century; the most notable writers of this period were Juan Ruiz de Alarcón and Juana Inés de la Cruz. Sor Juana was famous in her own time, called the "Ten Muse".

Nineteenth-century liberal of Nahua origin Ignacio Manuel Altamirano is an important writer of the era, along with Vicente Riva Palacio, the grandson of Mexican hero of independence Vicente Guerrero, who authored a series of historical novels as well as poetry. The late colonial-era novel by José Joaquín Fernández de Lizardi, The Mangy Parrot ("El Periquillo Sarniento"), is said to be the first Latin American novel. In the modern era, the novel of the Mexican Revolution by Mariano Azuela (Los de abajo, translated to English as The Underdogs) is noteworthy. Poet and Nobel Laureate Octavio Paz, novelist Carlos Fuentes, Alfonso Reyes, Renato Leduc, essayist Carlos Monsiváis, journalist and public intellectual Elena Poniatowska, Juan Rulfo (Pedro Páramo), Martín Luis Guzmán, and Nellie Campobello (Cartucho) are other important Mexican writers.

=== Cinema ===
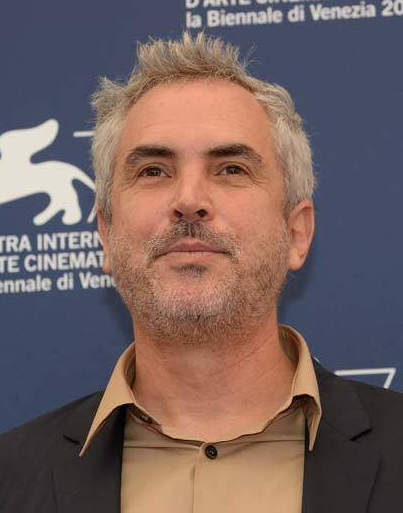
Alfonso Cuarón, the first Mexican filmmaker to win the Academy Award for Best Director

Mexican films from the Golden Age in the 1940s and 1950s are the greatest examples of Latin American cinema, with a huge industry comparable to the Hollywood of those years. Mexican films were exported and exhibited in all of Latin America and Europe. María Candelaria (1943) by Emilio Fernández, was one of the first films awarded a Palme d'Or at the Cannes Film Festival in 1946, the first time the event was held after World War II. The famous Spanish-born director Luis Buñuel realized in Mexico between 1947 and 1965 some of his masterpieces like Los Olvidados (1949) and Viridiana (1961). Famous actors and actresses from this period include María Félix, Pedro Infante, Dolores del Río, Jorge Negrete and the comedian Cantinflas.

More recently, films such as Como agua para chocolate (1992), Sex, Shame, and Tears (1999), Y tu mamá también (2001), and The Crime of Father Amaro (2002) have been successful in creating universal stories about contemporary subjects, and were internationally recognized. Mexican directors Alejandro González Iñárritu (Babel, Birdman, The Revenant, Bardo, False Chronicle of a Handful of Truths), Alfonso Cuarón (A Little Princess, Harry Potter and the Prisoner of Azkaban, Gravity, Roma), Guillermo del Toro (Pan's Labyrinth, Crimson Peak, The Shape of Water, Nightmare Alley), screenwriter Guillermo Arriaga and photographer Emmanuel Lubezki are some of the most known present-day film makers.

=== Music and dance ===
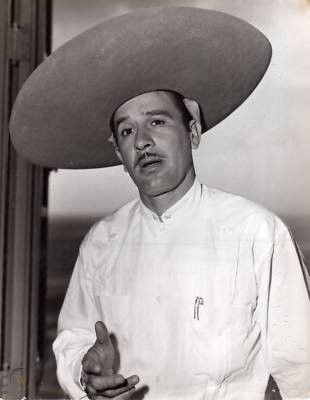
Pedro Infante was a popular ranchera singer.

Mexico has a long tradition of music from the prehispanic era to the present. Much of the music from the colonial era was composed for religious purposes.

Although the traditions of European opera and especially Italian opera had initially dominated the Mexican music conservatories and strongly influenced native opera composers (in both style and subject matter), elements of Mexican nationalism had already appeared by the latter part of the 19th century with operas such as Aniceto Ortega del Villar's 1871 Guatimotzin, a romanticized account of the defense of Mexico by its last Aztec ruler, Cuauhtémoc. The most well-known Mexican composer of the twentieth century is Carlos Chávez (1899–1978), who composed six symphonies with indigenous themes, and rejuvenated Mexican music, founding the Orquesta Sinfónica Nacional.

Traditional Mexican music includes mariachi, banda, norteño, ranchera, and corridos. Corridos were particularly popular during the Mexican Revolution (1910–20) and in the present era include narcocorridos. The embrace of rock and roll by young Mexicans in the 1960s and 1970s brought Mexico into the transnational, counterculture movement of the era. In Mexico, the native rock culture merged into the larger countercultural and political movement of the late 1960s, culminating in the 1968 protests and redirected into counterculture rebellion, La Onda (the wave).

On an everyday basis most Mexicans listen to contemporary music such as pop, rock, and others in both English and Spanish. Folk dance of Mexico along with its music is both deeply regional and traditional. Founded in 1952, the Ballet Folklórico de México performs music and dance of the prehispanic period through the Mexican Revolution in regional attire in the Palacio de Bellas Artes.

Some example of international success from Mexico Los Lobos, Maná, and Carlos Santana where is it in Rock and Roll Hall of Fame.

=== Media ===
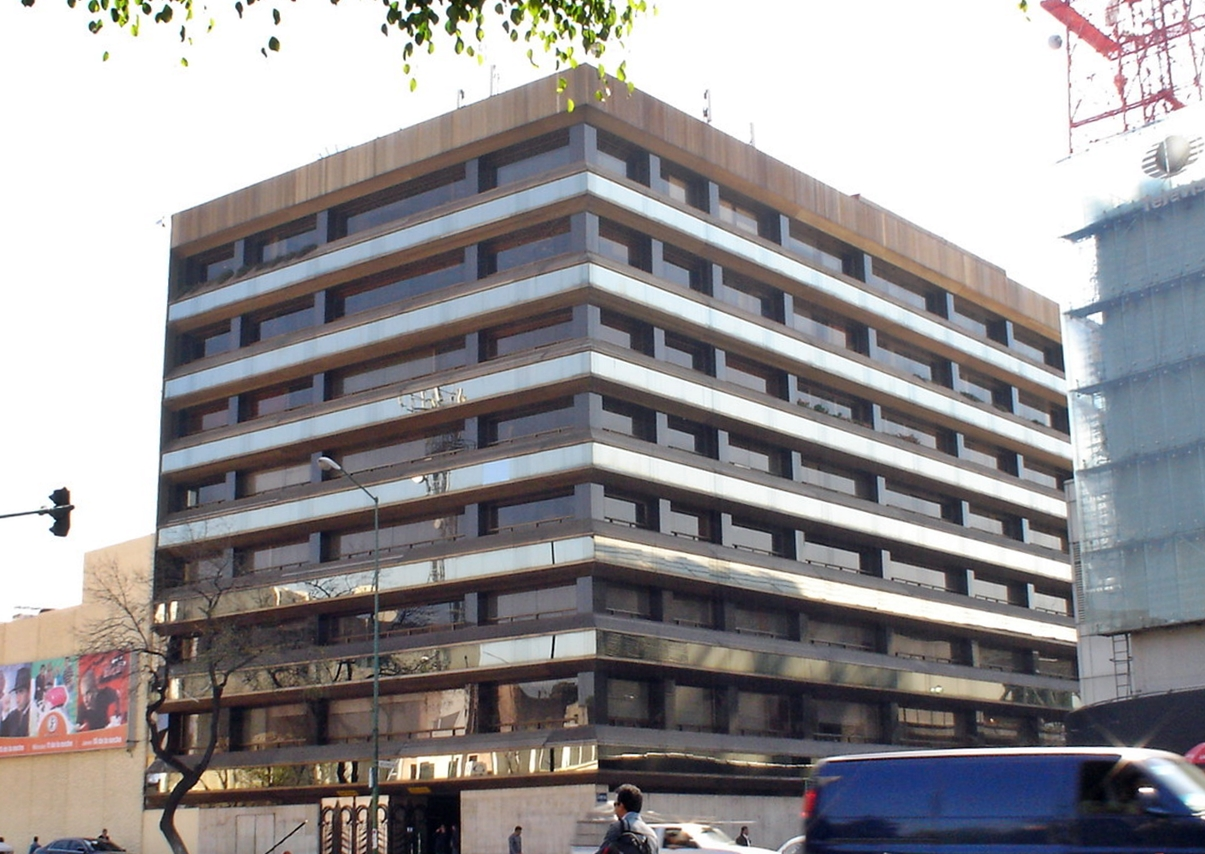
The Televisa headquarters in Mexico City

Telenovelas, or soap operas, are very traditional in Mexico and are translated to many languages and seen all over the world. Mexico was a pioneer in edutainment, with TV producer Miguel Sabido creating in 1970s "soap operas for social change". The "Sabido method" has been adopted in many other countries subsequently, including India, Peru, Kenya, and China. The Mexican government successfully used a telenovela to promote family planning in the 1970s to curb the country's high birth rate.

Bilingual government radio stations broadcasting in Spanish and indigenous languages were a tool for indigenous education (1958–65) and since 1979 the Instituto Nacional Indigenista has established a national network of bilingual radio stations.

There was a major reform of the telecommunications industry in 2013, with the creation of new broadcast television channels. There had been a longstanding limitation on the number of networks, with Televisa, with a virtual monopoly; TV Azteca, and Imagen Television. New technology has allowed the entry of foreign satellite and cable companies. Mexico became the first Latin American country to transition from analog to all digital transmissions.

=== Cuisine ===
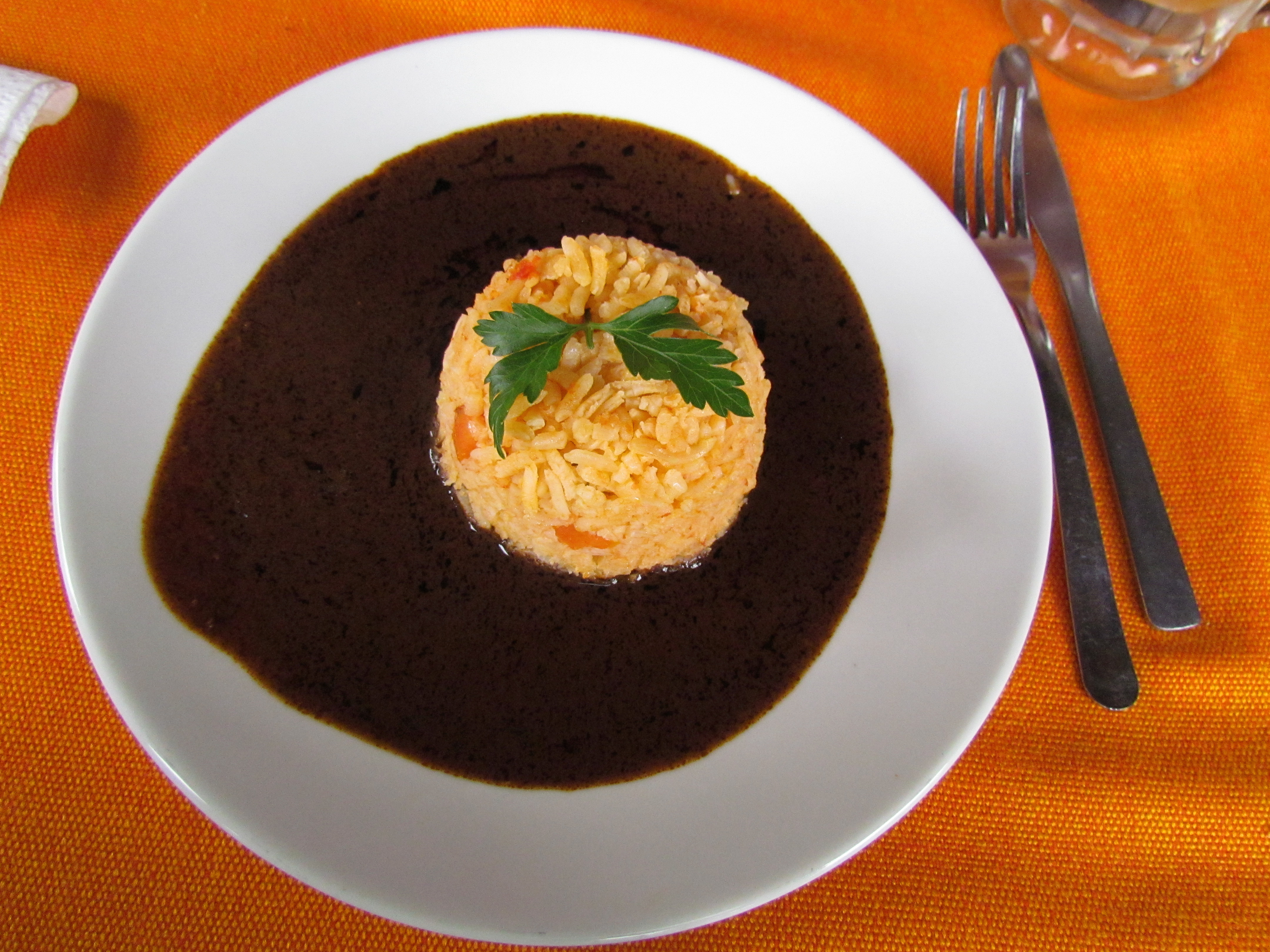
Mole sauce, which has dozens of varieties across the Republic, is seen as a symbol of Mexicanidad and is considered Mexico's national dish

The origin of the current Mexican cuisine was established during the Spanish colonial era, a mixture of the foods of Spain with native indigenous ingredients. Foods indigenous to Mexico include corn, pepper vegetables, calabazas, avocados, sweet potato, turkey, many beans, and other fruits and spices. Similarly, some cooking techniques used today are inherited from pre-Columbian peoples, such as the nixtamalization of corn, the cooking of food in ovens at ground level, grinding in molcajete and metate. With the Spaniards came the pork, beef and chicken meats; peppercorn, sugar, milk and all its derivatives, wheat and rice, citrus fruits and another constellation of ingredients that are part of the daily diet of Mexicans.

From this meeting of two millennia old culinary traditions, were born pozole, mole sauce, barbacoa and tamale in its current forms, chocolate, a large range of breads, tacos, and the broad repertoire of Mexican street foods. Beverages such as atole, champurrado, milk chocolate and aguas frescas were born; desserts such as acitrón and the full range of crystallized sweets, rompope, cajeta, jericaya, and the wide repertoire of delights were created in the convents of nuns in all parts of the country.

In 2005, Mexico presented the candidature of its gastronomy for World Heritage Site of UNESCO, the first time a country had presented its gastronomic tradition for this purpose. The result was negative, because the committee did not place the proper emphasis on the importance of corn in Mexican cuisine. In November 2010, Mexican gastronomy was recognized as Intangible cultural heritage by UNESCO. In April 2019, Daniela Soto-Innes was named the best female chef in the world by The World's Best 50 Restaurants and Elena Reygadas in 2023.

=== Sports ===
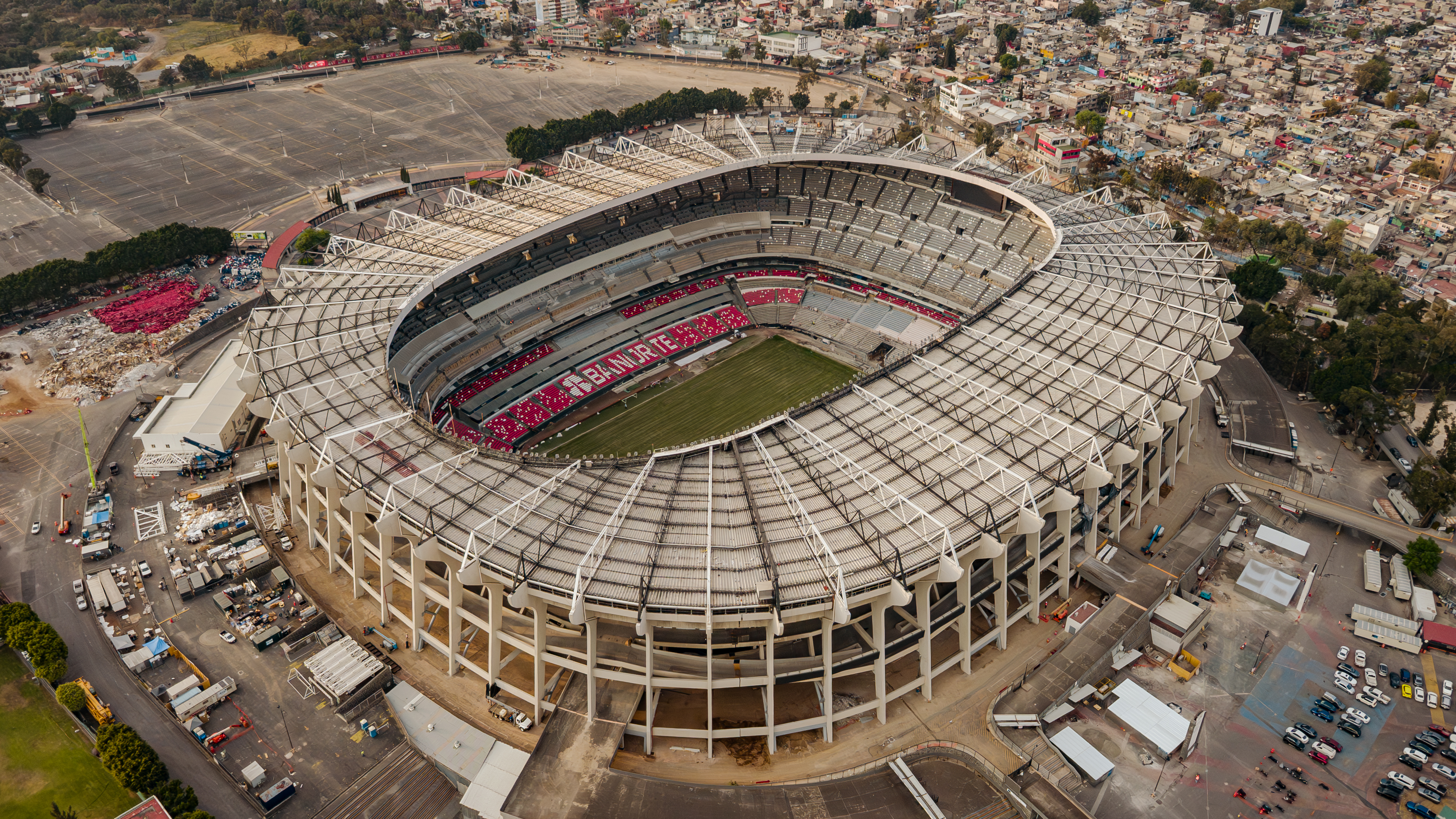
Azteca Stadium, Mexico City

Organized sport in Mexico largely dates from the late nineteenth century, with only bullfighting having a long history dating to the early colonial era. Once the political turmoil of the early republic was replaced by the stability of the Porfiriato did organized sport become public diversions, with structured and ordered play governed by rules and authorities. Baseball was introduced from the United States and also via Cuba in the 1880s and organized teams were created. After the Mexican Revolution, the government sponsored sports to counter the international image of political turmoil and violence. Mexico's most popular sport is association football.

The bid to host the 1968 Summer Olympics was to burnish Mexico's stature internationally. The government spent abundantly on sporting facilities and other infrastructure to make the games a success, but those expenditures helped fuel public discontent with the government's lack of spending on social programs. Mexico City hosted the XIX Olympic Games in 1968, making it the first Latin American city to do so. Mexico hosted the 1970 FIFA World Cup and the 1986 FIFA World Cup and co-hosted, along with Canada and the United States, the 2026 FIFA World Cup. With its past hosting of the 1970 and 1986 tournaments, Mexico became the first country to host or co-host the men's World Cup three times.

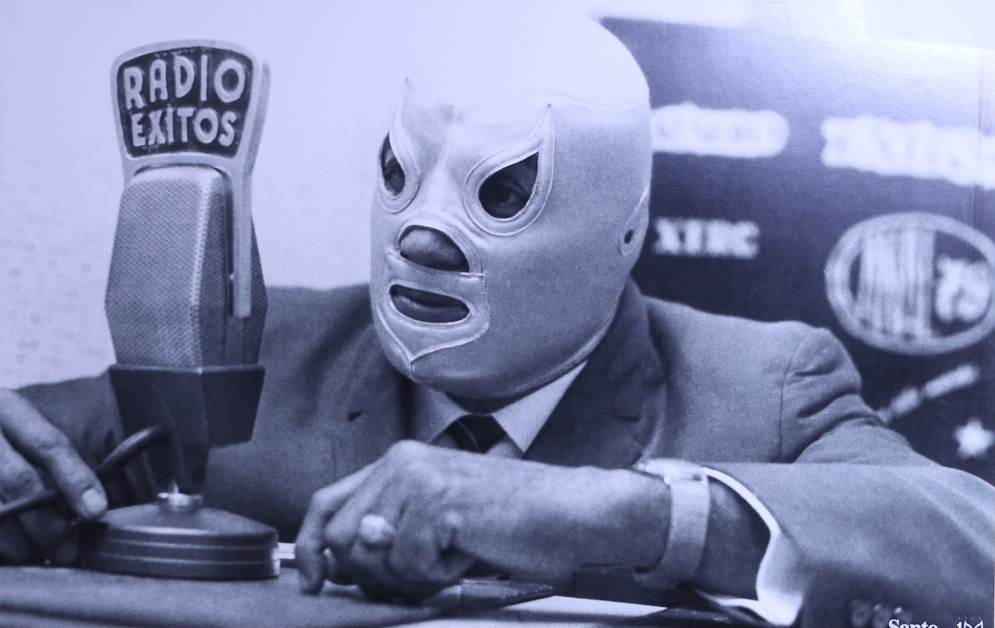
El Santo, one of the most iconic Mexican luchadores

Mexico is an international power in professional boxing. Fourteen Olympic boxing medals have been won by Mexico. The Mexican professional baseball league is named the Liga Mexicana de Beisbol. While usually not as strong as the United States, the Caribbean countries and Japan, Mexico has nonetheless achieved several international baseball titles. Lucha Libre (freestyle professional wrestling) is also major crowd draw with national promotions such as CMLL, AAA and others.

Bullfighting is a popular sport in the country, and almost all large cities have bullrings. Plaza México in Mexico City, which seats 45,000 people, is the largest bullring in the world.

== See also ==
- List of Mexican drug cartels
- Mexican War of Independence
- Outline of Mexico
