= Energy in Mexico =

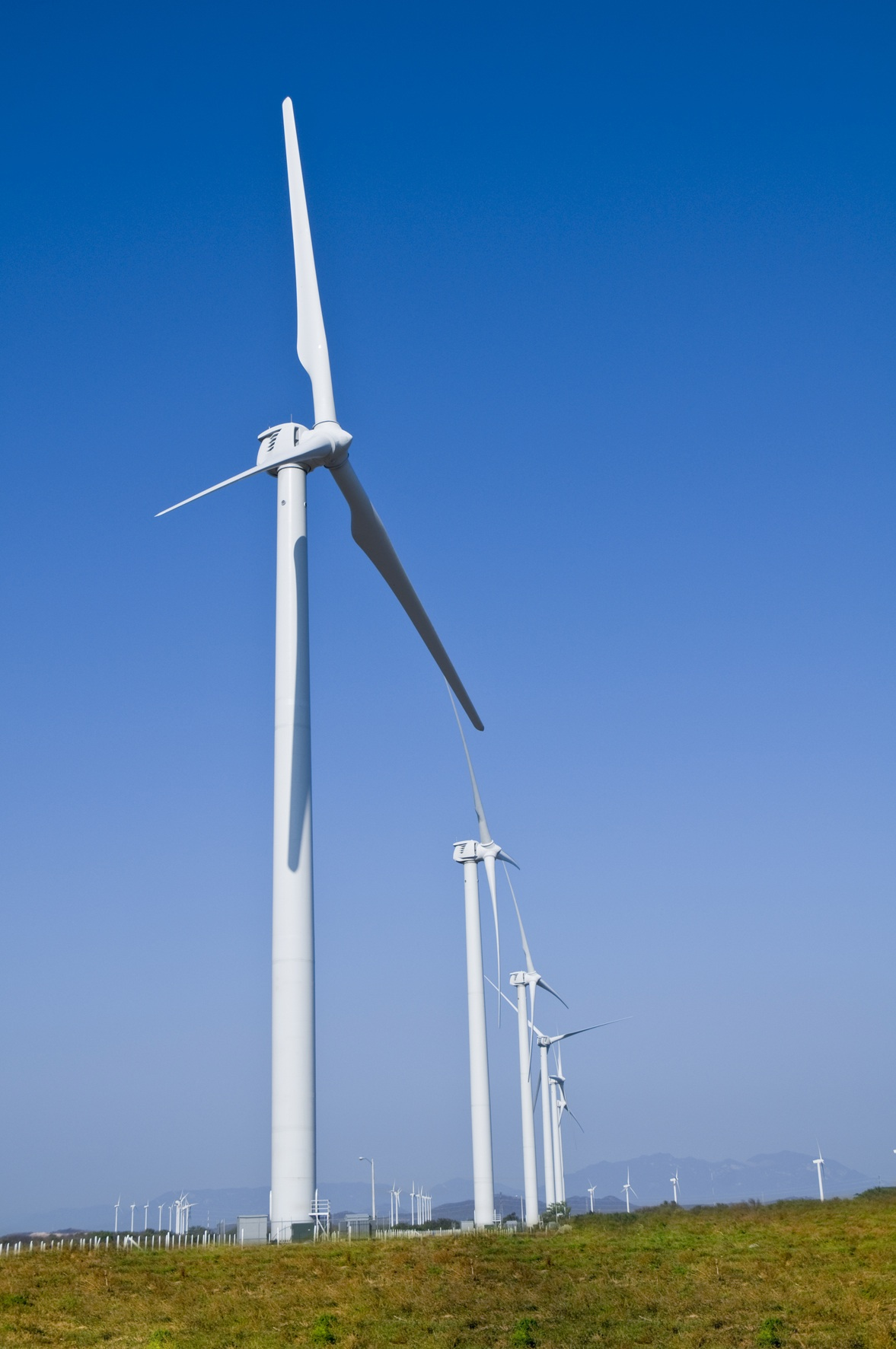
La Mata-La Ventosa Wind Farm

Mexico total primary energy consumption by fuel in 2015
1. Coal (7.00%)
2. Natural Gas (41.0%)
3. Hydro (4.00%)
4. Nuclear (1.00%)
5. Oil (45.0%)
6. Others (Renew.) (2.00%)

Energy in Mexico describes energy, fuel, and electricity production, consumption, and import in Mexico.

In 2008, Mexico produced 234 TWh of electricity, of which, 86 TWh was from thermal power stations, 39 TWh from hydropower, 18 TWh from coal, 9.8 TWh from nuclear power, 7 TWh from geothermal power and 0.255 TWh from wind power. Mexico is among the world's top oil producers and exporters.

In 2022, Mexico's total energy supply (TES) consisted of oil, accounting for 44.3%, with natural gas at 39.0%, and coal at 5.5%. Biofuels and waste constituted 5.0% of the total, while other renewables, such as hydro, wind, and solar, combined to form 4.8%. Nuclear energy contributed a minor portion, representing 1.5% of the overall energy supply.

Energy in Mexico
	Capita	Prim. energy	Production	Export	Electricity	CO_{2}-emission
	Million	TWh	TWh	TWh	TWh	Mt
2004	104.0	1,925	2,952	1,002	188	374
2007	105.7	2,143	2,920	723	214	438
2008	106.6	2,100	2,717	549	215	408
2009	107.4	2,031	2,559	492	218	400
2010	108.3	2,071	2,633	508	226	417
2012	109.2	2,165	2,654	418	250	432
2012R	117.1	2,191	2,547	266	246	436
2013	118.4	2,224	2,518	253	255	452
Change 2004-10	4.1%	7.6%	-10.8%	-49.3%	20.3%	11.6%
Mtoe = 11.63 TWh. Prim. energy includes energy losses 2012R = CO_{2} calculation criteria changed, numbers updated

== Oil production ==
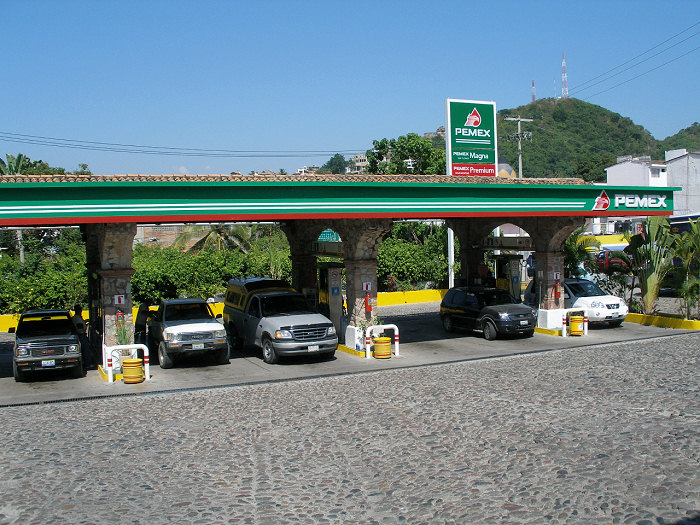
A gas station in Puerto Vallarta

History of oil production in Mexico

The petroleum industry in Mexico makes Mexico the eleventh largest producer of oil in the world and the thirteenth largest in terms of net exports. Mexico has the seventeenth largest oil reserves in the world, and it is the fourth largest oil producer in the Western Hemisphere behind the United States, Canada and Brazil. Mexico is a member of OPEC+ and the United States–Mexico–Canada Agreement.

The petroleum sector is a significant contributor to the Mexican economy, with oil revenues generating almost 7% of Mexico's export earnings. In 2014, income from the petroleum sector made up 33% of public sector income, and taxes on the revenues of the state-owned oil company Petróleos Mexicanos (Pemex) formed roughly 20% of all tax revenues collected by the Mexican government in 2022.

While a significant contributor to the overall Mexican economy, the industry has been criticized as a driver of pollution and environmental destruction. In some cases, residents of extraction zones have expressed negative opinions regarding the effects that the oil industry has on their community. In addition to this, issues such as corruption and fuel theft hinder operational efficiency.

== Renewable energy ==
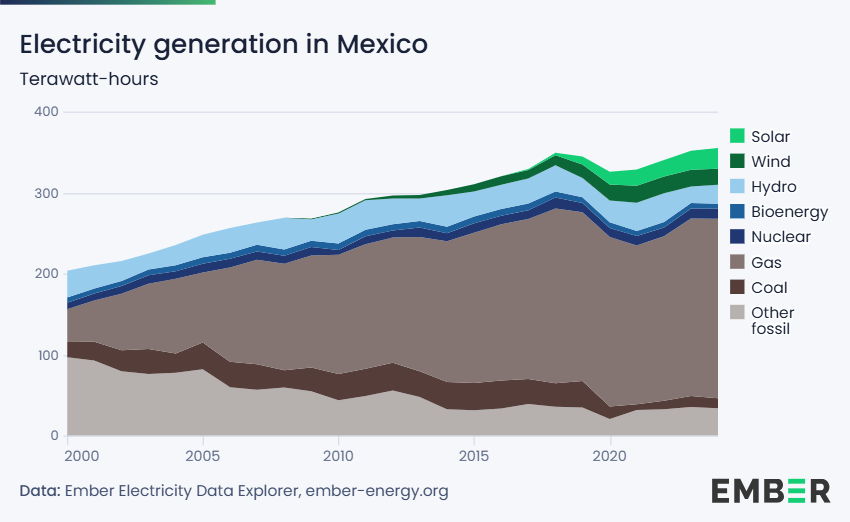
Electricity generation in Mexico in terawatt-hours

Renewable energy in Mexico contributes to 26 percent of electricity generation in Mexico. As of 2009, electricity generation from renewable energy comes from biomass, hydro power, geothermal, solar power and wind. There is a long term effort established to increase the use of renewable energy sources. The amount of geothermal energy used and harvested, places Mexico as number four in the world.

As the importance of clean sustainable energy becomes more prevalent, the country and government officials continue to invest in research and innovations to continue to allow Mexico to be a leading example of renewable energy. Predictions based on current energy standings lead the country to anticipate by 2035, the 26 percent renewable energy in Mexico will rise to 35 percent.

Not only will this prove a more sustainable future it also increases jobs in rural areas. Jobs increased by 14 percent within the last 8 years in the renewable energy sector. With the objection to create more in-home jobs for residents of Mexico, an increase in sustainable energy, results in lower demand for conventional fuels such as fuel oil, petrol gas, coal and natural gas. With lower demand for these fuels, mainly gasoline and diesel and on the rise jet fuel, this will result in a lower need for imports. With relying on fewer imports, national security is higher.

=== Geothermal power ===
Mexico had the sixth greatest geothermal energy production in 2019. Mexico is home to the largest geothermal power stations in the world, the Cerro Prieto Geothermal Power Station.

As of 2026, another of the largest operational plants is es:Central geotermoeléctrica Los Azufres.

In 2017, Los Humeros III entered operation, situated upon the Los Humeros volcanic caldera.

=== Wind power ===
External images
- Oaxaca Wind Resource Map
- Northwestern Mexico Border Areas - 50m Wind Power

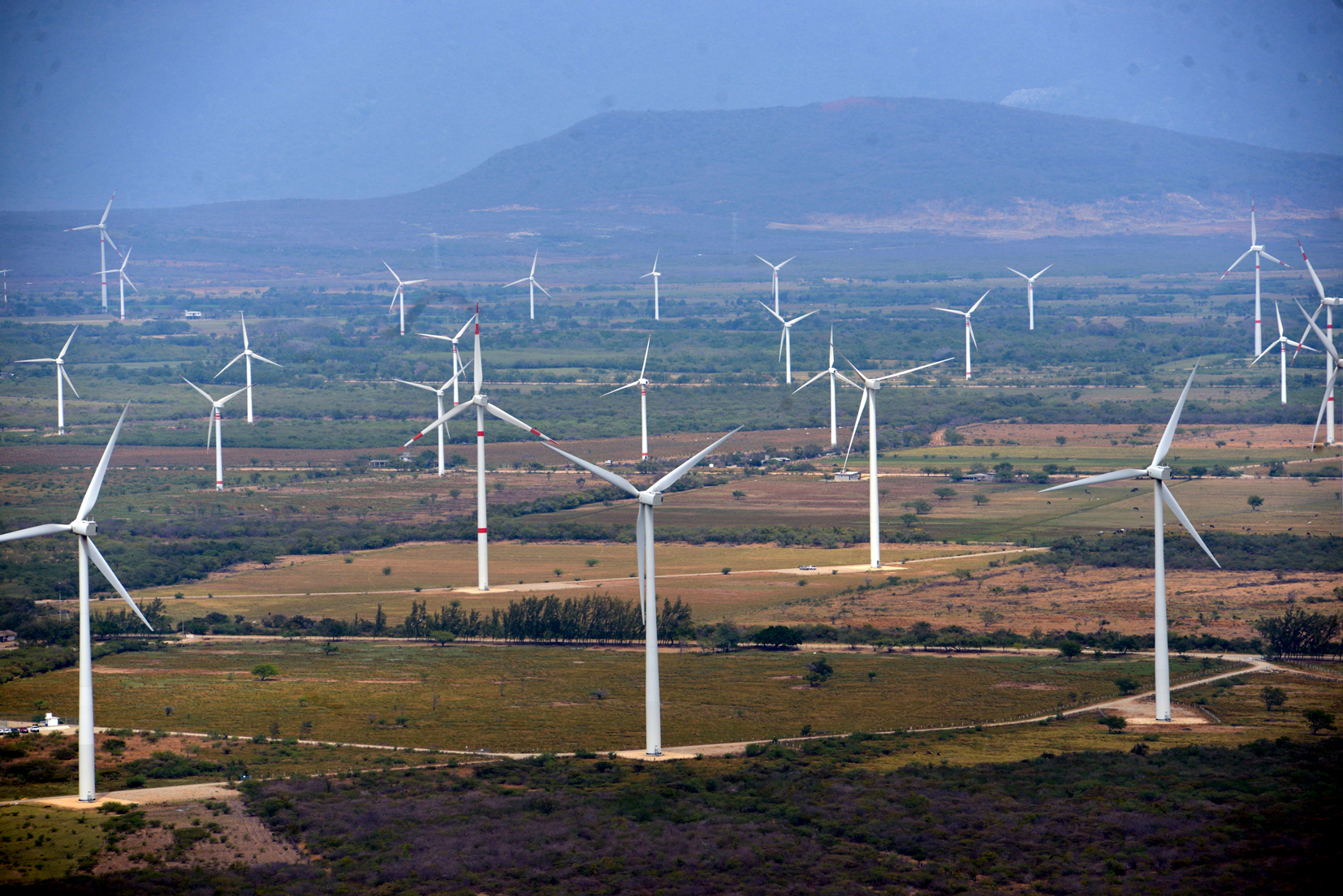
The Central Eólica Sureste I, Fase II in Oaxaca

Mexico is rapidly growing its production of wind power. In 2016, its installed capacity had reached 3,527 MW, increasing to 8,128 MW in 2020.

In 2008, there were three wind farms in the country. The Eurus Wind Farm was the largest wind farm in Latin America. 18 of 27 wind farms construction projects were based in La Ventosa in the Isthmus of Tehuantepec in Oaxaca, also referred to as the wind farm corridor. According to the Mexican Wind Energy Association, Mexico was predicted to progress to rank twentieth worldwide in wind capacity by the end of 2012, and to produce four percent of the country's total electricity production. It also projected that the nation would have 12 GW (16,000,000 hp) of wind generation capacity by 2020, and would be able to provide fifteen percent of Mexico's production. Brian Gardner, Economist Intelligence Unit's energy analyst, said, "With strong wind through the south, consistent sunlight in the north and a stable market, Mexico is well positioned for continued renewables growth". Wind power is in partial competition with solar power in Mexico.

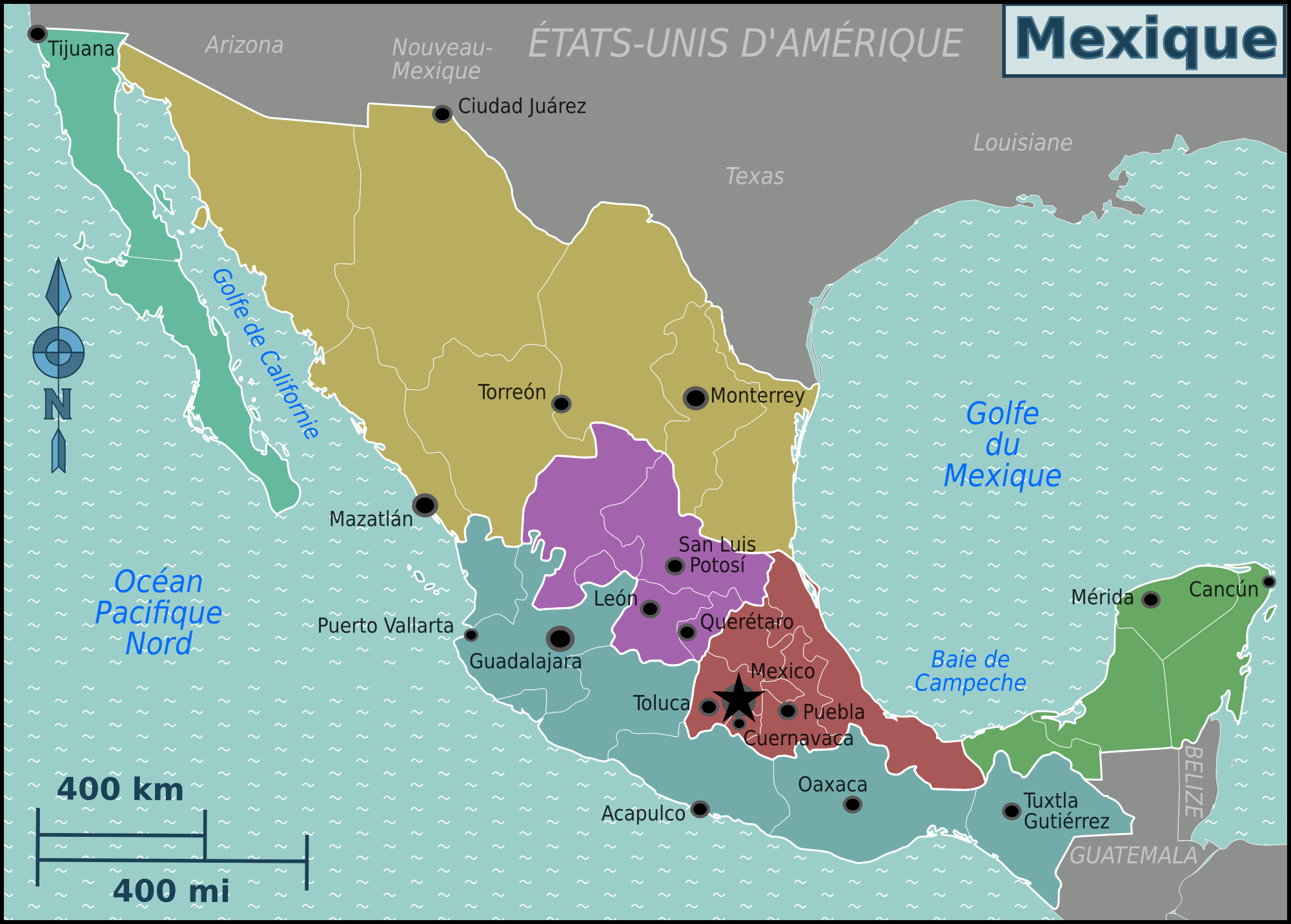
Regions of Mexico

=== Electricity ===
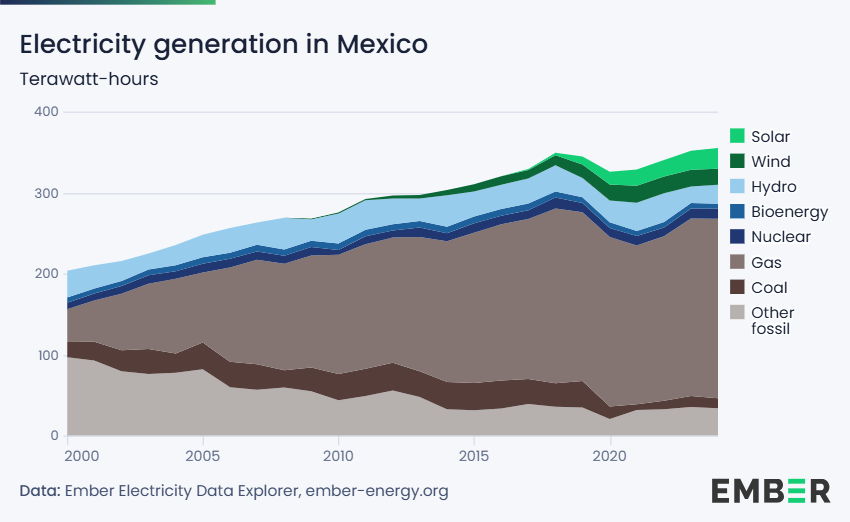
Electricity generation in Mexico in terawatt-hours

The electricity sector in Mexico is federally owned, as required by the Constitution, with the Federal Electricity Commission (Comisión Federal de Electricidad or CFE) essentially controlling the whole sector; private participation and foreign companies are allowed to operate in the country only through specific service contracts. Attempts to reform the sector have traditionally faced strong political and social resistance in Mexico, where subsidies for residential consumers absorb substantial fiscal resources.

The electricity sector relies heavily on thermal sources (75% of total installed capacity), followed by hydropower generation (19%). Although exploitation of solar, wind, and biomass resources has a large potential, geothermal energy is the only renewable source (excluding hydropower) with a significant contribution to the energy mix (2% of total generation capacity). Expansion plans for the period 2006-2015 estimate the addition of some 14.8 GW of new generation capacity by the public sector, with a predominance of combined cycles.

In 2022, Mexico's electricity generation primarily came from four key sources: natural gas (56.8%), oil (13.5%), coal (6.8%), and renewables (19.5%)—which included hydroelectric power, wind energy, solar PV systems, geothermal energy, biofuels, and waste. As of 2026, most of Mexico's electricity comes from oil (33 TWh) and gas (221 TWh).

=== Carbon capture and storage ===
Mexico highly depends on the burning of its fossil fuels, and for the same reason, it is in its interest to look into mitigation solutions for its corresponding emissions. In the General Law on Climate Change on 2012, Mexico promised to reduce 20% of its greenhouse gas (GHG) emissions by 2020 and 50% by 2050, as well as in the Paris Agreement. 19% of this new mitigation plan will be dedicated to carbon capture and storage and specifically 10% to the energy industry.

=== Energy Secretariat ===
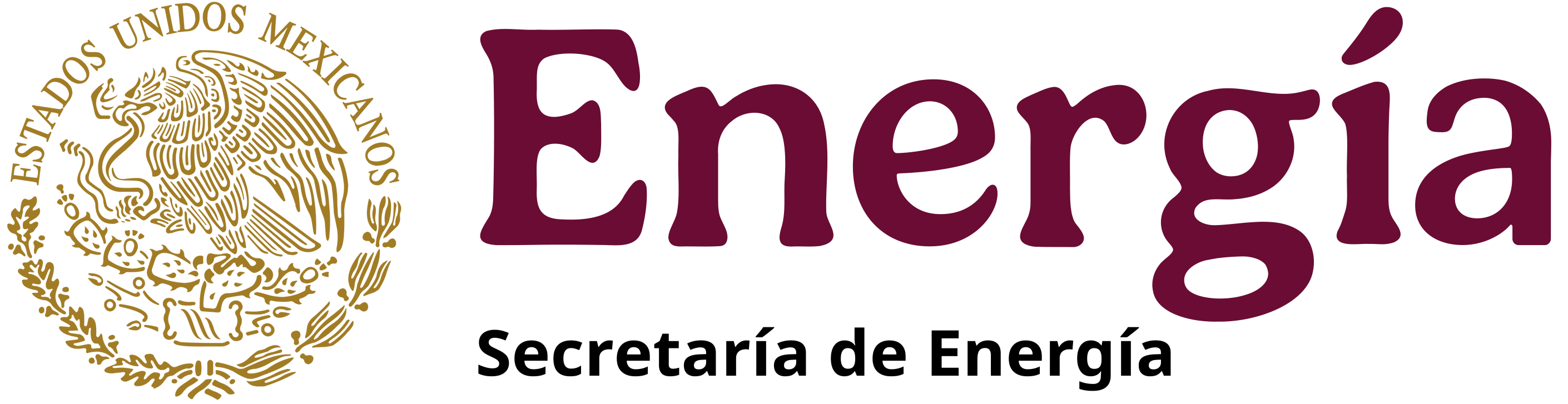

In Mexico, the Secretariat of Energy (Spanish: Secretaría de Energia) is the government department in charge of production and regulation of energy. This secretary is a member of the Executive Cabinet.

== See also ==
- List of power stations in Mexico
- Electricity sector in Mexico
