= SEGH-CFE 1 =

Photovoltaic power stations in Mexico

- Country: Mexico
- Location: Puerto Libertad, Sonora
- Coordinates: 29°55′N 112°42′W
- Status: Under construction
- Construction began: 2012
- Commission date: 2013 (expected)

Solar farm
- Type: Flat-panel PV

Power generation
- Units operational: 187,200 solar panels
- Nameplate capacity: 46.8 MW

SEGH-CFE 1 is a photovoltaic project immediately adjacent to the Comisión Federal de Electricidad power station in Puerto Libertad, Sonora in Mexico, approximately 115 kilometres (71 mi) south of the United States border. The project is developed by Sonora Energy Group Hermosillo, S.A. de C.V., a privately owned company.

The project, will have capacity of 46.8 MW. The array will consist of 164,211 solar panels. Project EPC responsibilities are being provided by American Electric Technologies Inc. along with combiner boxes, inverters, transformers and switch-yard equipment (NASDAQ: AETI). Substation equipment and interconnect responsibilities are being provided by ABB (NASDAQ: ABB).

Over the course of each year for the next twenty years, the project will generate approximately 107,000,000 kWh of electricity.

All of the electricity will be sold directly to the CFE and absorbed into the utility’s transmission system for distribution throughout their existing network. At an installed capacity of 46.8 MWp, when complete in 2013, the project will be the first utility scale project of its kind in Mexico and the largest solar project of any kind in Latin America. The company has permit applications for three additional projects under review by Mexican officials.

== See also ==
- Electricity sector in Mexico
- Solar power in Mexico
