= Electricity sector in Mexico =

Mexico: Electricity sector

Data
- Electricity coverage (2015): 98.7%
- Total Energy Generation (2024): 352,305 GWh
- Gross Energy Consumption (2024): 359,807 GWh
- Installed capacity (2024): 90.543 GW
- Share of fossil energy: 65.0%
- Share of renewable energy: 35.0% (hydro, wind, solar & geothermal)
- Share of nuclear energy: 2.4%
- GHG emissions from electricity generation (2004): 114 MtCO_{2}e
- Average electricity use (2008): 1,665 kWh per capita
- Continuity of supply: 2.2 hrs interruption per subscriber per year
- Total losses (2008): 11% (CFE), 32% (LFC); (LAC average in 2005: 13.6%)
- Average residential tariff (US$/kWh, 2008): 0.106; (LAC average in 2005: 0.115)
- Average industrial tariff (US$/kWh, 2008): medium: 0.153, large: 0.118 (LAC average in 2005: 0.107)
- Average agricultural tariff (US$/kWh, 2008): 0.051
- Annual investment in electricity: n/a
- Share of self-financing by utilities: n/a
- Share of Government financing: n/a

Institutions
- Sector unbundling: No
- Share of private sector generation: 25%
- Share of private sector in distribution: 0%
- Competitive supply to large users: No
- Competitive supply to residential users: No
- Number of service providers: dominating 2: CFE & LFC (LFC now part of CFE, since 2009)
- Responsibility for transmission: CFE (Comisión Federal de Electricidad)
- National electricity regulator: Yes (CRE)
- Responsibility for policy setting: SENER
- Responsibility for renewable energy: SENER
- Responsibility for the environment: SEMARNAT
- Electricity Sector Law: Yes (1976, last revision 1992)
- Renewable Energy Law: Yes (2008)
- CDM transactions related to the energy sector: 47 registered CDM project; 3.7 million tCO_{2}e annual emissions reductions

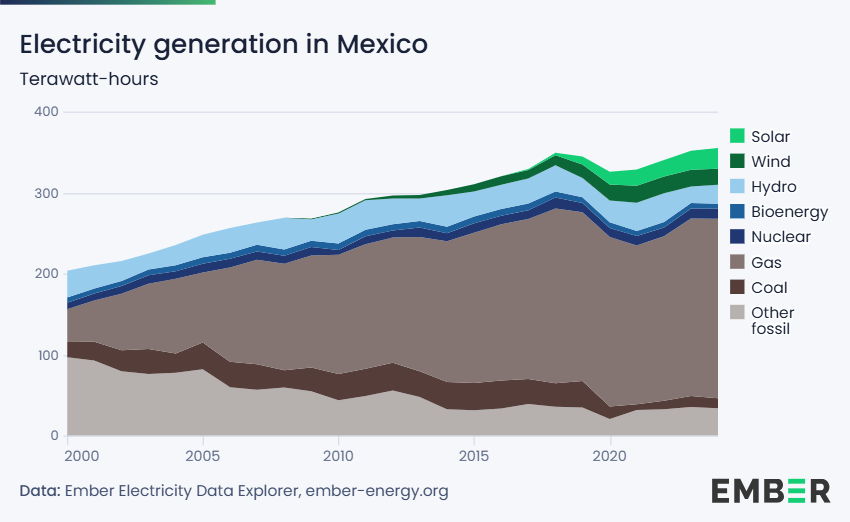
Electricity generation in Mexico in terawatt-hours

The electricity sector in Mexico is federally owned, as required by the Constitution, with the Federal Electricity Commission (Comisión Federal de Electricidad or CFE) essentially controlling the whole sector; private participation and foreign companies are allowed to operate in the country only through specific service contracts. Attempts to reform the sector have traditionally faced strong political and social resistance in Mexico, where subsidies for residential consumers absorb substantial fiscal resources.

The electricity sector relies heavily on thermal sources (75% of total installed capacity), followed by hydropower generation (19%). Although exploitation of solar, wind, and biomass resources has a large potential, geothermal energy is the only renewable source (excluding hydropower) with a significant contribution to the energy mix (2% of total generation capacity). Expansion plans for the period 2006-2015 estimate the addition of some 14.8 GW of new generation capacity by the public sector, with a predominance of combined cycles.

== Electricity Supply and Demand ==
Installed capacity by source in Mexico (2020)

- Fossil (oil, gas, coal): 55,776 MW (66.3%)
- Hydro: 12,612 MW (15.0%)
- Wind: 6,977 MW (8.3%)
- Solar: 5,795 MW (6.9%)
- Nuclear: 1,608 MW (1.9%)
- Geothermal: 951 MW (1.1%)
- Biomass: 408 MW (0.5%)

=== Installed capacity ===
Installed electricity capacity in 2008 was 58 GW. Of the installed capacity, 75.3% is thermal, 19% hydro, 2.4% nuclear (the single nuclear power plant Laguna Verde) and 3.3% renewable other than hydro. The general trend in thermal generation is a decline in petroleum-based fuels and a growth in natural gas and coal. Since Mexico is a net importer of natural gas, higher levels of natural gas consumption (i.e. for power generation) will likely depend upon higher imports from either the United States or via liquefied natural gas (LNG).

Gross generation was 234 TWh that same year (not including cogeneration and autogeneration), with 79.2% coming from conventional thermal sources, 16.6% from hydroelectricity, 4.2% from nuclear power and 3% from geothermal sources.

The expansion program contemplated by SENER for the period 2008-2017 includes the addition of 14,794 MW by the public service: 14,033 MW by CFE and 761 MW by LFC (Luz y Fuerza del Centro). Self-supply and cogeneration will add another 2,490 MW in new capacity. Total public installed capacity in 2017 is estimated at 61,074 MW, 40% and 21% of which would be combined-cycles and hydroelectric plants respectively. However, the deactivation of LFC on October 10, 2009, is likely to change this figure.

In 2009, 4,000 MW were already compromised (i.e. with secured financing). The table below summarizes the projects that are currently (September 2009) under construction:

ENERGY SOURCE	LOCATION	TECHNOLOGY	TOTAL EXPECTED CAPACITY (MW)	2007	2009	2010	2012
External Energy Producers			450		450		
CCC Norte	Durango	Combined Cycle		450		450	
Financed Public Works			1,789		388	651	750
CC San Lorenzo Conversion from GT to CC	Puebla	Combined Cycle	116		116		
CCC Baja California	Baja California	Combined Cycle	272		272		
CCE Pacífico	Guerrero	Coal	651			651	
CH La Yesca	Nayarit	Hydroelectric	750				750
Budget Implementation (LFC)			160	160			
Distributed generation	D.F. and Mexico State	Gas turbines	160	160			
Total			2,399	160	838	651	750

Source: SENER Statistics

In 2024, total electricity generation in Mexico reached 352,305 GWh, while gross electricity consumption amounted to 359,807 GWh. As of December 2024, the installed generation capacity of the national power system reached 90,543 MW, of which 63.1% corresponds to conventional power plants and 36.9% to facilities based on clean energy technologies. Compared to 2010, total installed capacity increased by 64.3%, while the share of clean technologies rose from 26.1% to 36.9%. The installed generation capacity determines the maximum amount of electrical energy that can be produced.

=== Effective Energy Generation ===
Years	Hydro electric	Thermal ^{1}	IPP's ^{2}	Dual ^{3}	Coal- fired	Nuclear	Geo thermal	Wind- driven	Total
2010 ^{P}	11,503	21,742	11,907	2,778	2,600	1,365	965	85	52,945
2009	11,383	21,731	11,457	2,100	2,600	1,365	965	85	51,686
2008	11,343	21,191	11,457	2,100	2,600	1,365	965	85	51,105

Source: Secretaría de Energía with data from Comisión Federal de Electricidad and Luz y Fuerza del Centro
^{1} Thermoelectric power plants (residual fuel oil, natural gas and diesel)
^{2} Installed capacity of Independent Power Producers.
^{3} Dual power plants can operate with coal or fuel oil
^{P} Preliminary

=== Imports and exports ===
The external electricity trade is carried out through nine interconnections between the United States and Mexico and one interconnection with Belize. These connections have primarily been used to import and export electricity during emergencies. In 2007, Mexico exported 1.3 TWh of electricity to the United States, while importing 0.6 TWh.

Companies have built power plants near the United States - Mexico border with the aim of exporting generation to the United States. There are also plans to connect Mexico with Guatemala and Belize as part of the Central American Interconnection System. The 400 kV interconnection line Mexico - Guatemala was commissioned in April 2009 and has an estimated transmission capacity of 200 MW from Mexico to Guatemala and 70 MW in the opposite direction.

CFE is not a part of the North American Electric Reliability Corporation, though its transmission system in northern Baja California is part of the Western Electricity Coordinating Council, and it also has a few other interconnections across the border with the United States.

=== Demand ===
Consumption of electricity in 2008 was 184 TWh, which corresponds to 1,655 kWh per capita. Consumption share by sector was as follows:

- Residential: 26%
- Industrial: 59% (38% for mid-sized industry and 21% for large industry)
- Commercial: 7%
- Agriculture: 4%
- Services: 4%

=== Demand and supply projections ===
Electricity demand has grown steadily in the last decade and the Energy Secretariat (SENER) forecasts that consumption will grow by 3.3% a year for the next ten years, reaching 281.5 TWh in 2017. Demand growth forecasts have been revised down, from an estimated 4.8% a year in the projections from 2006, due to the expected effects of the economic crisis on energy demand.

=== Reserve margin ===
In 2008, the installed reserve margin (RM) in the National Interconnected System (SIN) was 45.8%, while the operating reserve margin (ORM) was 21.3%. It is estimated that both reserve margins will remain high during the 2009-2013 period. However, from 2014, the RM is expected to decrease to 29.2%, with the ORM reaching an 8.3%. Those values would be about 25% and 6% respectively in 2017. The commissioning of the Agua Prieta II, Norte II, Norte III, Noreste and Valle de Mexico II and III is essential to avoid power deficits in the northern and central parts of the country. However, irrespective of the reserve margins in the SIN, there are restrictions in transmission capacity that generate bottlenecks or the need to import power.

== Access to electricity ==
Total electricity coverage in Mexico is 98.7% (2015). With 99.7% coverage in urban areas with more than 100,000 inhabitants; 99.3% in locales with 15,000-99,999 inhabitants; 98.8% in areas with 2,500-14,999 inhabitants and 96.1% in locales with fewer than 2,500 inhabitants.

== Service Quality ==
=== Interruption frequency and duration ===
In 2008, the average number of interruptions per subscriber was 2.3 for CFE and 4.2 for LFC. Duration of interruptions per subscriber was 2.2 hours for CFE and 3 for LFC.

=== Total losses ===
Total electricity losses in 2008 were 11% for CFE and as high as 32% for LFC.

== Responsibilities in the Electricity Sector ==
=== Policy and Regulation ===
The Energy Secretariat (SENER) is in charge of defining the energy policy of the country within the framework defined by the Constitution. The Energy Regulatory Commission (CRE) is, since 1995, the main regulatory agency of the electricity and gas sector. However, CRE's attributions are limited since CFE (Federal Electricity Commission) and LFC (Central Light and Power) are outside its scope.

=== Generation ===
The generation sector was opened to private participation in 1992. However, the Comisión Federal de la Electricidad (CFE), the state-owned utility, is still the dominant player in the generation sector, with two-thirds of installed capacity. As of the end of 2008, private generators held about 23 GW of generation capacity, mostly consisting of combined-cycle, gas-fired turbines (CCGFT). Private generators have to sell all their output to CFE since they are not allowed to sell directly to users. There is indeed a commercialization monopoly controlled by CFE.

In the period between 1997 and 2009, CRE has awarded 22 permits for Independent Power Producers (IPP), for a total of 13 GW. Total private generation permits awarded by CRE as of September 2009 are summarized in the table below:

Modality	Number of permits	Total capacity (MW)	Percentage of total national capacity (%)
Autogeneration	589	6,102	6%
Cogeneration	57	3,255	4.5%
Independent Power Production (IPP)	22	13,250	19.5%
Small Generation	19	3	negligible

=== Transmission and Distribution ===
CFE holds a monopoly on electricity transmission and distribution in the country. CFE operates the national transmission grid, composed of 27,000 miles (43,000 km) of high voltage lines, 28,000 miles (45,000 km) of medium voltage lines, and 370,000 miles (600,000 km) of low voltage distribution lines, through one of its departments, the Centro Nacional de Control de la Energía (CENACE).

== Renewable Energy Resources ==
The two main government agencies in charge of developing renewable energy resources are SEMARNAT and SENER. The Environment and Natural Resources Secretariat (SEMARNAT) is responsible for environmental policy and the preservation of renewable and non-renewable resources, while SENER defines the national energy policy. CONAE, the National Commission for Energy Savings, is responsible for promoting energy savings and energy efficiency. Finally, SEDESOL, the National Secretariat for Social Development, includes the promotion and use of renewable energy in some of their projects.

The Renewable Energy Development and Financing for Energy Transition Law (LAERFTE), which entered into force on November 28, 2008, mandated SENER to produce a National Strategy for Energy Transition and Sustainable Energy Use and a Special Program for Renewable Energy. The Special Program contains tentative targets for renewable generation for different technologies. Those targets will be revised as SENER and CRE advance in the completion of the activities included in the law.

=== Hydro ===
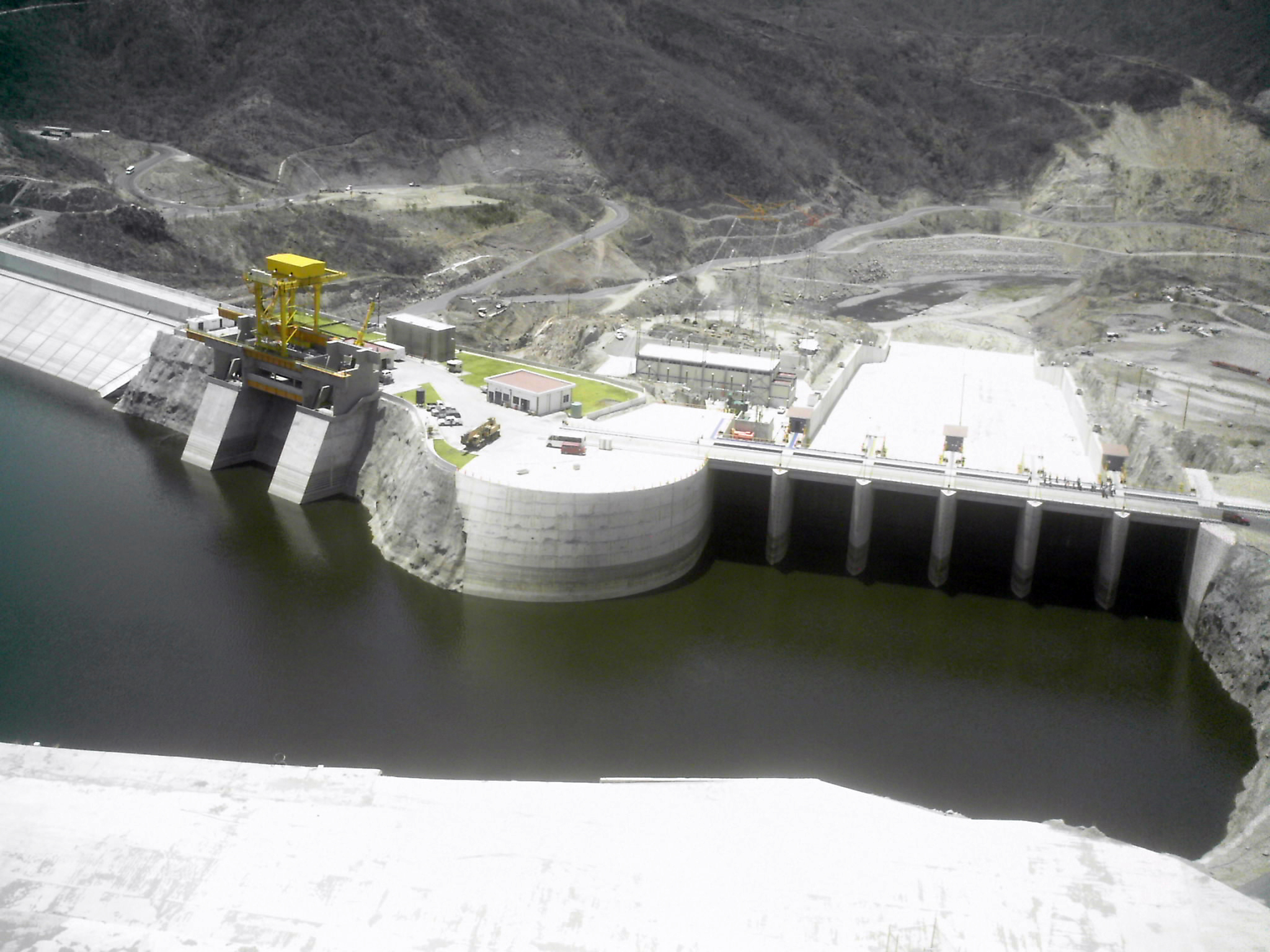
A panoramic picture of the El Cajón dam, in the state of Nayarit, Mexico

The largest hydro plant in Mexico is the 2,400 MW Manuel Moreno Torres (Chicoasén Dam) in Chicoasén, Chiapas, in the Grijalva River. This is the world's fourth most productive hydroelectric plant. The 750 MW El Cajon hydroelectric plant in Nayarit, which started operations in November 2006, is the latest completed large project.

The country has an important mini-hydro potential, estimated at 3,250 MW (in the states of Chiapas, Veracruz, Puebla and Tabasco) In 2009, there were 22 private mini-hydro installations (12 in operation, 2 inactive and 8 under construction), adding up to a total of 83.5 MW in operation, with 105 MW under development. The number of publicly owned hydro plants in 2009 was 42: 31 of them (270MW) belong to CFE, while the remaining 11 (23.4MW) belong to LFC.

=== Solar ===
Mexico is the country with the world's third largest solar potential. The country's gross solar potential is estimated at 5 kWh/m^{2} daily, which corresponds to 50 times the national electricity generation. Currently, there is over 1 million square meters of solar thermal panels installed in Mexico, while in 2005, there were 115,000 square meters of solar PV (photo-voltaic). It is expected that in 2012 there will be 1.8 million square meters of installed solar thermal panels.

The project named SEGH-CFE 1, located in Puerto Libertad, Sonora, Northwest of Mexico, will have capacity of 46.8 MW from an array of 187,200 solar panels when complete in 2013.

=== Wind ===
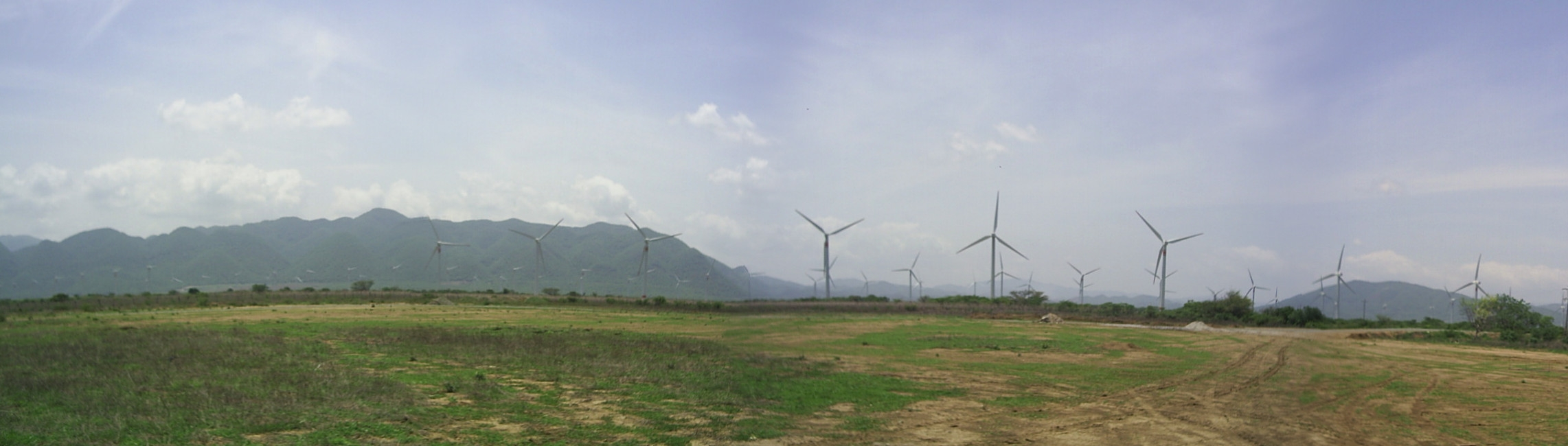
La Venta in Oaxaca, Mexico

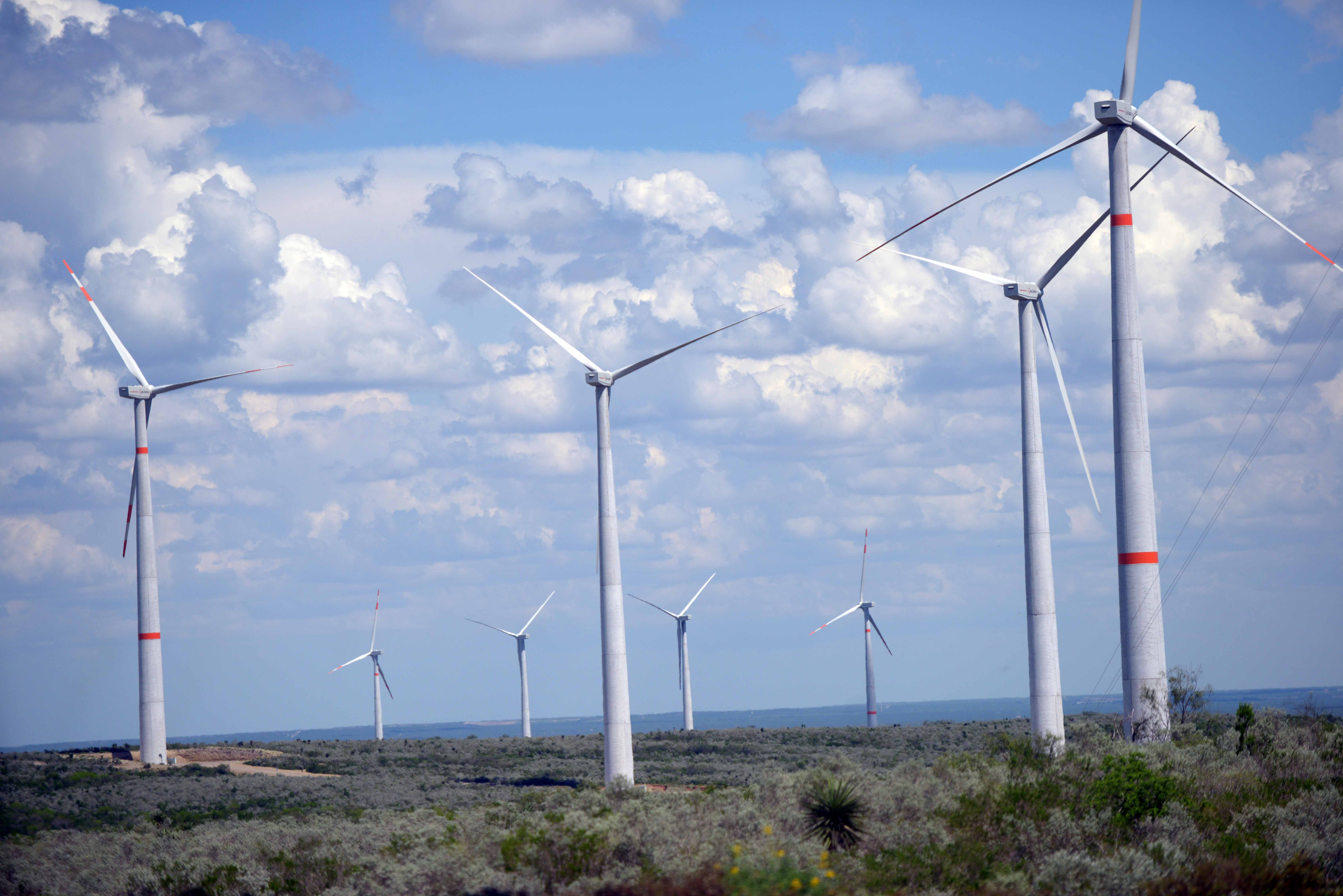
Wind turbines at the Parques Eólicos Ventika located in General Bravo

Wind power production is still very limited in Mexico, although the country's potential is estimated to be very high. Three main areas for wind generation have been identified: the Isthmus of Tehuantepec, in the state of Oaxaca; La Rumorosa, in the state of Baja California; The area of the Gulf of California, which includes Baja California, Baja California Sur, Sonora and Sinaloa, the Yucatán Peninsula, and the states of Zacatecas, Hidalgo, Veracruz.

In 2012, according to SENER, CFE will have 593MW of installed wind generation capacity in Mexico. Currently, there are several projects in operation and under development. The tables below show both the wind farms that have already been committed and some of the potential ones: in Mexico some groups are promoting wind power through outreach activities to increase population awareness of renewable energies.

COMMITTED PROJECTS
PROJECT	DEVELOPER	REGION	MODALITY	CAPACITY (MW)	COMMISSIONING DATE
La Venta	CFE	Oaxaca	Public Service	1.35	11/1994
Guerrero Negro	CFE	Baja California	Public Service	0.6	03/1999
La Venta II	CFE	Oaxaca	Public Service	83.3	01/2007
Eurus	Acciona	Oaxaca	Autogenerator	250	12/2009
Parques Ecológicos de México	Iberdrola	Oaxaca	Autogenerator	79.9	01/2009
Fuerza Eólica del Istmo	Fuerza Eólica-Peñoles	Oaxaca	Autogenerator	30	2010
Eléctrica del Valle de México	EdF Energies Nouvelles-Mitsui	Oaxaca	Autogenerator	67.5	2009
Bii Nee Stipa Energía Eólica	CISA-Gamesa	Oaxaca	Autogenerator	26.3	2009
La Venta III	CFE	Oaxaca	IPP	101.4	11/2010
Oaxaca I	CFE	Oaxaca	IPP	101.4	2010
Centro Regional de Tecnología Eólica	Instituto de Investigaciones Eléctricas	Oaxaca	Small generator	5	N/A
Desarrollos Eólicos Mexicanos	Demex	Oaxaca	Small generator	227.5	2011
Eoliatec del Pacífico	Eoliatec	Oaxaca	Autogenerator	160.5	2011
Eoliatec del Istmo (2nd phase)	Eoliatec	Oaxaca	Autogenerator	142.2	2011
Los Vergeles	SEER	Tamaulipas	Autogeneration	160	2010
Gamesa Energia	Gamesa	Oaxaca	Autogenerator	288	2011
Vientos del Istmo	Preneal	Oaxaca	Autogenerator	180	2012
Energía Alterna Istmeña	Preneal	Oaxaca	Autogenerator	215.9	2012
Unión Fenosa Generación México	Unión Fenosa	Oaxaca	Autogenerator	227.5	2010
Fuerza Eólica del Istmo (2nd phase)	Fuerza Eólica	Oaxaca	Autogenerator	50	2011
Oaxaca II-IV	CFE	Oaxaca	IPP	304.2	09/2011
Total				2,565	

Source: SENER 2009, Programa especial para el aprovechamiento de energías renovables

POTENTIAL PROJECTS
PROJECT	DEVELOPER	REGION	MODALITY	CAPACITY (MW)	COMMISSIONING DATE
Fuerza Eólica de Baja California	Fuerza Eólica	Baja California	Export	300	N/A
Mexico Wind	Unión Fenosa/Geobat	Baja California	Export	500	N/A
N/A	Cannon Power	Baja California	Export	200	N/A
Baja Wind	Sempra Energy	Baja California	Export	250	2011
Baja California	Fuerza Eólica	Baja California	Autogeneration	10	N/A
N/A	State Government	Baja California	Autogeneration	300	N/A
Los Vergeles	SEER	Tamaulipas	Autogeneration	160	2010
Eólica Santa Catarina	Econergy	Nuevo León	Autogeneration	20	N/A
Total				1,450	

Source: SENER 2009, Programa especial para el aprovechamiento de energías renovables

=== Geothermal ===
Mexico has a large geothermal potential due to its intense tectonic and volcanic activity. This potential has been estimated at 1,395 MW by CFE, although this figure is likely to be much higher. It ranks third in geothermal power production worldwide. In 2009, geothermal installed capacity was 964.5 MW and total production was 7.1 TWh. There are four geothermal fields under exploitation: Cerro Prieto, Los Azufres, Los Humeros and Las Tres Vírgenes.

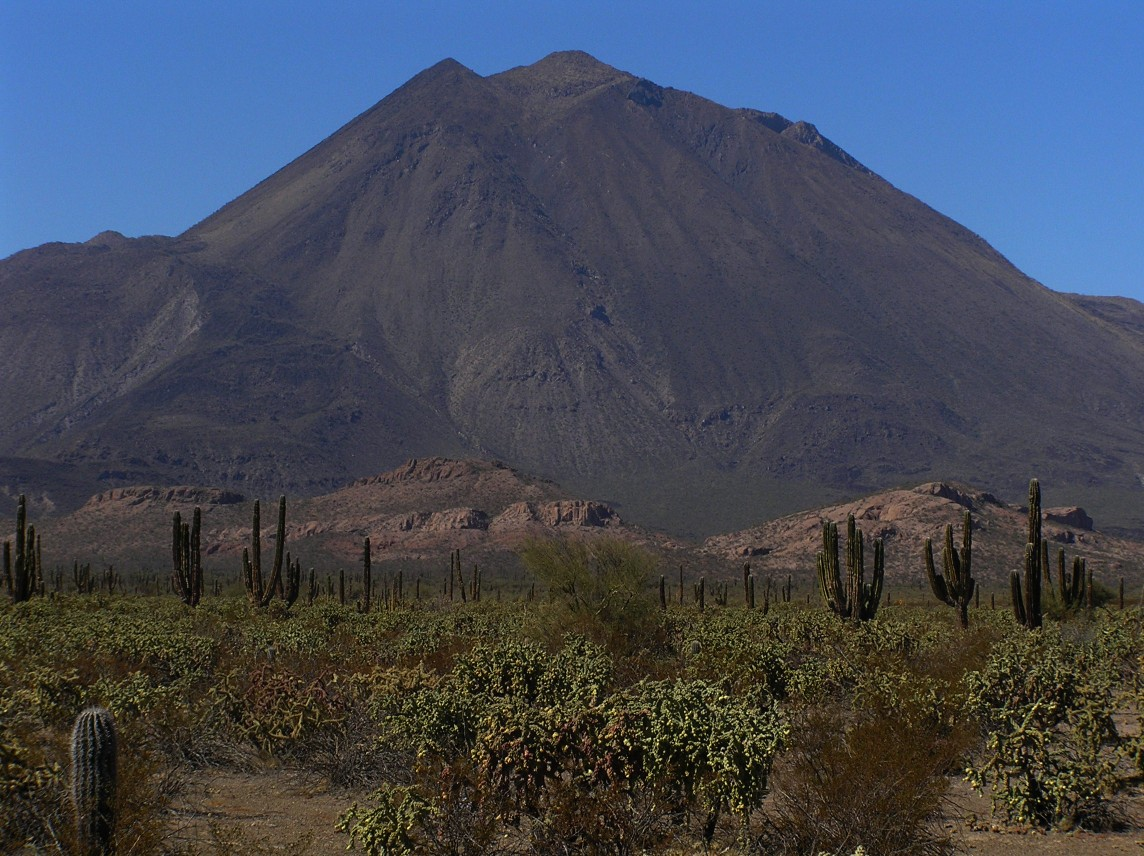
El Virgen

PROJECT	MUNICIPALITY	ENTITY	NUMBER OF UNITS	NET CAPACITY (MW)	GROSS GENERATION (GWh)
Cerro Prieto	Mexicali	Baja California	13	720	5,176
Tres Virgenes	Mulegé	Baja California Sur	2	10	42
Azufres	Cd. Hidalgo	Michoacán	15	194.5	1,517
Humeros	Chignautla	Puebla	8	40	7,055
Total			38	965	7,056

Source: SENER 2009, Programa especial para el aprovechamiento de energías renovables

=== Biomass ===
Mexico also has a large potential to produce energy from biomass. It is estimated that, taking into account agricultural and forest waste with energy potential and solid urban waste from the ten main cities, the country has a potential capacity of 803 MW and could generate 4,507 MWh per year. In the sugarcane industry, the estimated power generation protential from bagasse is over 3,000 MWh per year.

== History of the electricity sector ==
=== 20th Century ===
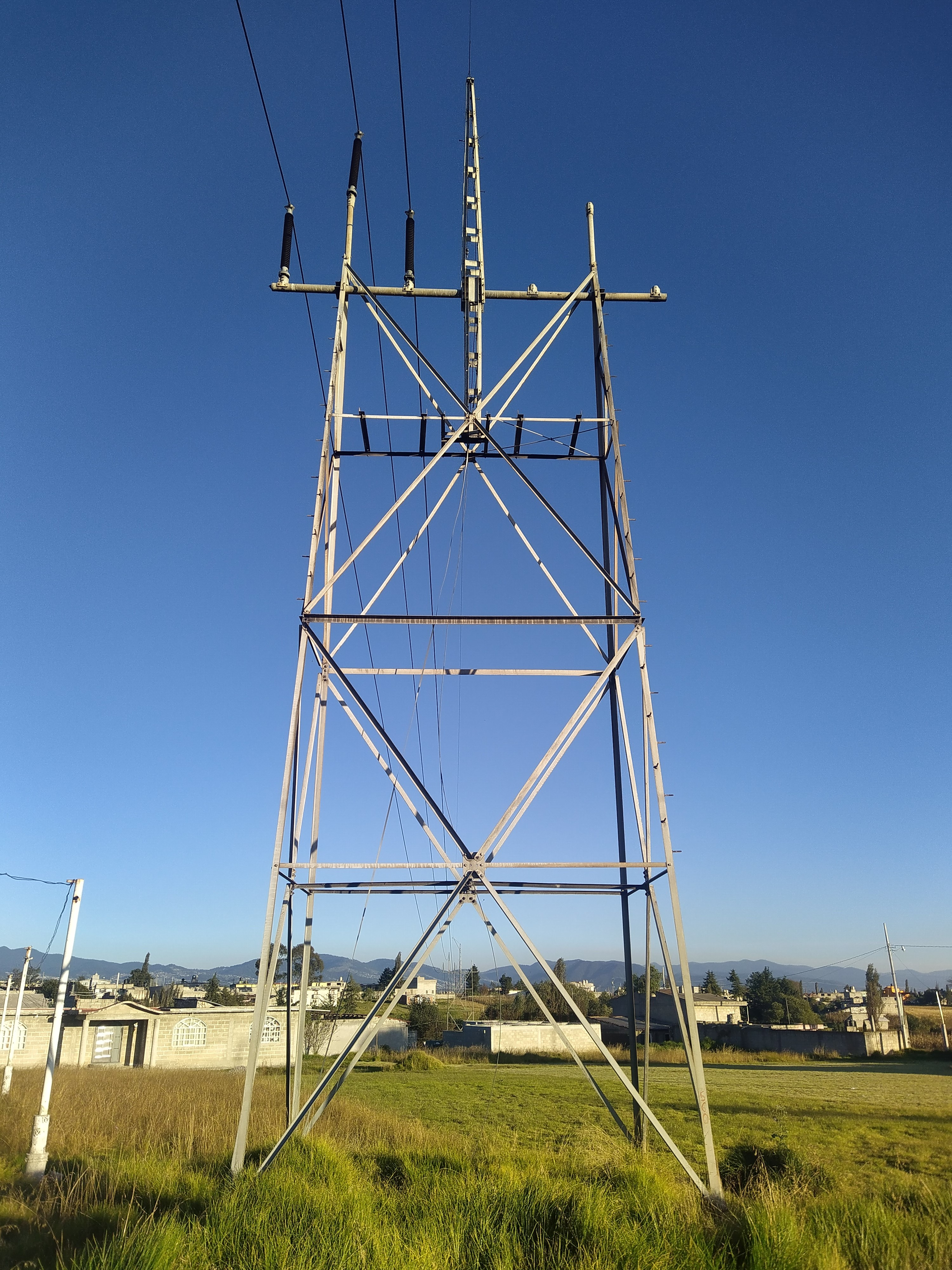
Original tower from 1905

Mexico was a pioneer in electric power transmission, through machinery and knowledge mainly came from the USA and Europe. In 1895 there was a 17 miles long power line for 10 kV from Barranca de Regla to Pachuca. The first overhead power line entirely placed on steel towers ran in 1903 over a distance of 101 miles between Zamora de Hidalgo and Guanajato with a voltage of 60 kV. Two years after, this record already was surpassed by a 171 miles long transmision line from Necaxa to Mexico City and El Oro de Hidalgo, when the hydroelectric plant in Necaxa opened. This 60 kV power line also was the world's longest power line in 1905. Despite the age, parts of both power lines are still in service. Around 1930, central Mexico already had an interconnected grid.

The electricity sector in Mexico underwent its first serious process of reorganizations during the 1930s, under the mandate of the Institutional Revolutionary Party (PRI). The National Electricity Code was created and the Federal Electricity Commission (CFE), a newly create state-owned and state-financed enterprise, came to dominate all investment in new capacity. In 1960, a constitutional amendment nationalized the electricity industry and formally gave the government exclusive "responsibility" for generating, transmitting, transforming, and distributing electricity. During this decade, the government also created Compañía de la Luz y Fuerza del Centro (LFC) to supply electricity to Mexico City and the neighboring states.

During the 1960s and the 1970s, Mexico alienated private investment and decided to prevent market forces from entering the power system. In addition, the surge in oil prices of the 1970s provided a windfall to oil-rich Mexico, which allowed the country to maintain substantial subsidies for electricity generation. Only during the late 1980s and the early 1990s, the Mexican government implemented market reforms in several economic sectors, including electricity.

In 1992, president Carlos Salinas reformed the electricity law, establishing that private electricity production was not a public service. This modification, which allowed for private participation in generation, was debated as unconstitutional for a long time; in fact in 2002 the Mexican Supreme Court ruled that it may have been unconstitutional. The Energy Regulatory Commission (CRE) was created in 1993 as an autonomous agency in charge of regulating the natural gas and electricity industries. However, its functions were only related to private power producers (e.g. award of permits, arbitration, tariff studies) and did not cover CFE and LFC. In this period the CRE's functions were mainly focused on the gas sector and not on electricity.

=== Reform attempts 1990s and 2000s ===
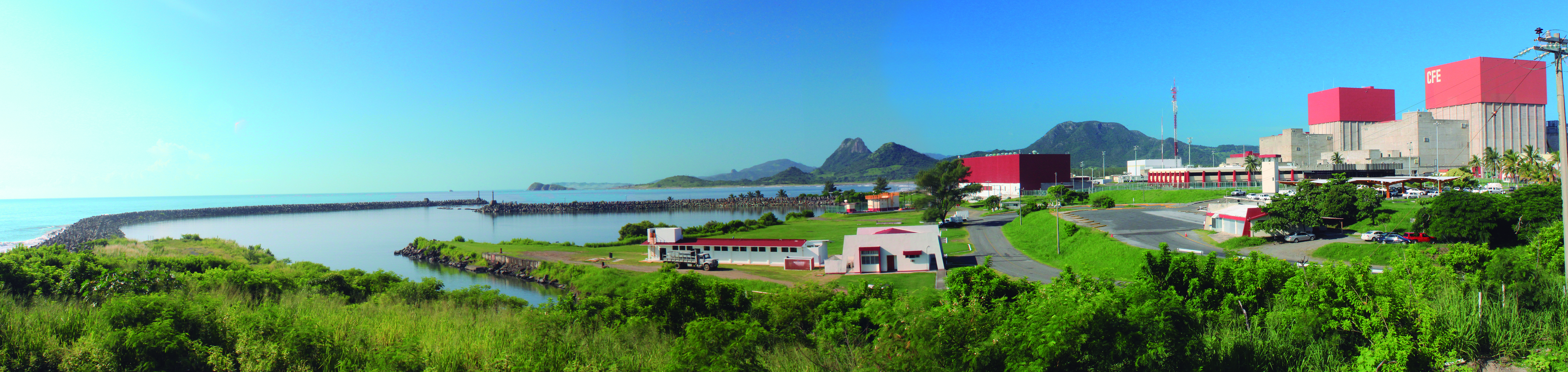
Panorama of the Laguna Verde nuclear power plant complex in Veracruz.

Attempts by president Ernesto Zedillo in the late 1990s, by the National Action Party (PAN) in 2000, and president Vicente Fox to carry out a comprehensive reform of the electricity sector in Mexico faced strong political resistance. In 1999, President Zedillo sent an ambitious bill to Congress requesting a change of the Constitution and allowing for the unbundling of the sector, including the creation of distribution companies under 3-year concessions. Existing power plants would also be sold, except for nuclear and hydro power plants. In 2001, President Fox issued a reform decree that would allow independent power producers to sell directly to industrial customers and would also allow the sale of private power to CFE under long-term contracts without competitive bidding. Among other issues, the decree also specified that electricity is not a public service of general interest but a commercial service. Both reform attempts failed, opposed on grounds that the electricity and, more broadly, the energy sector is strategic for national sovereignty. As required by the Constitution, the electricity sector remained federally owned, with the CFE essentially controlling the whole sector.

Among the different proposals for the reform of the electricity sector, the main ones are the creation of the CFE's Fundamental Law and the modification of this firm's operations and the extension of Electricity Regulatory Commission's (CRE) competencies. Also important is the promotion of private independent power production and the discussion of the role played by Pidiregas (see Financing below) in the financing of large projects.

=== Renewable Energy and Energy Efficiency laws 2008 ===
During the term of president Felipe Calderón, on 28 November 2008 two decrees published in the Official Journal of the Federation created two laws, one addressing renewable energy and the other energy efficiency.

The Renewable Energy Development and Energy Transition Financing Law (LAERFTE) mandated the Secretary of Energy (SENER) to produce a Special Program for Development of Renewable Energy (PEAER), and a National Strategy for Energy Transition and Sustainable Energy Use (ENTEASE), to be updated yearly. The main objective of the law is to regulate the use of renewable energy resources and clean technology, as well as to establish financing instruments to allow Mexico to scale-up electricity generation based on renewable resources. SENER and the Energy Regulatory Commission (CRE) are responsible for defining those mechanisms and establishing legal instruments.

The following functions are the responsibility of SENER, among others: (a) defining a national program for ensuring a sustainable energy development both in the short and the longer term, (b) creating and coordinating the necessary instruments to enforce the law, (c) preparing a national renewable energy inventory, (d) establishing a methodology to determine the extent to which renewable energies may contribute to total electricity generation, (e) defining transmission expansion plans to connect power generation from renewable energy to the national grid, and (f) promoting the development of renewable energy projects to increase access in rural areas.

The CRE is responsible for developing rules and norms regarding the implementation of LAERFTE, including provisions for promotion, production, purchase and exchange of electricity from renewable sources. The CRE, in coordination with the Secretary of Finance (SCHP) and SENER, will determine the price that suppliers will pay to the renewable energy generators. Payments will be based on technology and geographic location. In addition, CRE will set rules for contracting between energy generators and suppliers, obliging the latter to establish long-term contracts from renewable sources.

The Sustainable Energy Use Law (LASE) has as its objective to provide incentives for the sustainable use of energy in all processes and activities related to its exploitation, production, transformation, distribution and consumption, including energy efficiency measures. More specifically, the law proposes:

- The creation of a National Program for Sustainable Energy Use (PRONASE), which targets energy efficiency promotion in the public sector, as well as research and diffusion of sustainable energy use.
- The establishment of the National Commission for Efficient Energy Use (CONUEE) as a decentralized body of SENER that (i) will advise the national public administration and (ii) promote the implementation of best practices related to energy efficiency. This entity replaced the National Commission for Energy Saving (CONAE), which had been the leading government energy efficiency body.
- The creation of an Advisory Committee for Sustainable Energy Use (CCASE) as part of the CONUEE to evaluate the compliance of objectives, strategies, actions and goals of the program, consisting of the Energy Minister (SENER) and six academic researchers with extensive experience in the field.
- The creation of the National Subsystem of Information for Energy Use to register, organize, update and disseminate information about (i) energy consumption, its end-uses in distinct industries and geographical regions of the country, (ii) factors that impel these uses, and (iii) indicators of energy efficiency.

In this context, the Government carries the following specific activities: (i) a program aimed at replacing incandescent bulbs (IBs) with compact fluorescent lamps (CFLs) in the residential sector, (ii) an appliances replacement program, (iii) the modernization of the public transport system for long distances and surroundings, (iv) a program for energy efficiency in municipalities, (v) industrial and commercial energy efficiency programs, (vi) supply side energy efficiency in the electricity sector, and (vii) energy efficiency in the national oil company, PEMEX.

=== Takeover of Luz y Fuerza del Centro 2009 ===
On 12 October 2009, the police seized the offices of the state-owned Luz y Fuerza del Centro, dissolving the company, laying off the workers, and putting its operations, which supply power to 25 million Mexicans, under the control of the CFE. According to the government, spending at the company was increasingly outpacing sales.

=== Reforms from 2013 onwards ===
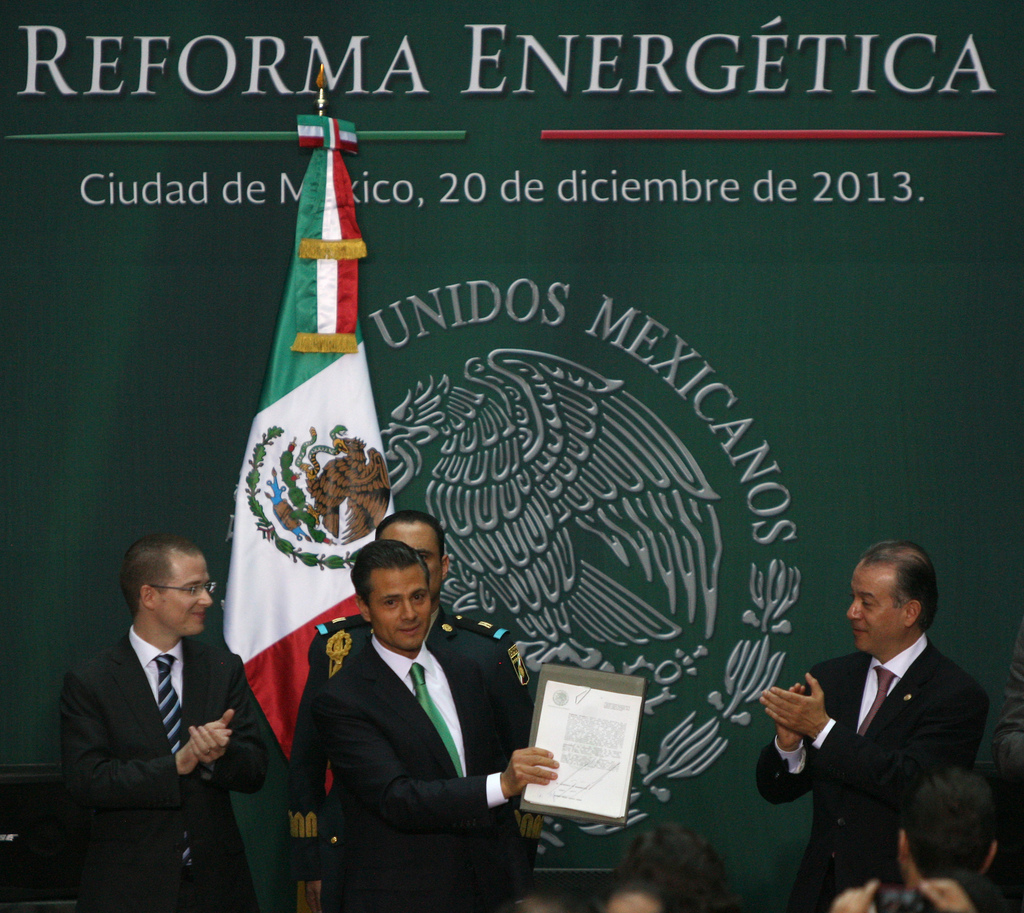
Ricardo Anaya and President Enrique Peña Nieto celebrating the promulgation of the Energy reform.

The energy sector in Mexico was reformed by an initiative that president Enrique Peña Nieto presented to the Congress of the Union on 12 August 2013. The reform was approved by the Senate on 11 December of that year, and by the Chamber of Deputies one day later. On 18 December the reform was declared constitutional, and it was signed into effect on 20 December by its publication in the Official Journal of the Federation. The initiative proposed that Article 27 of the Constitution of Mexico returned to the wording that it had in 1938 when president Lázaro Cárdenas made a first reform, which affirmed that the natural resources belong exclusively to the nation, but allowed the participation of private enterprises in the extraction and handling of these resources on behalf of the state. In 1960 a protectionist reform had made it impossible for any private company to participate in the energy sector, so the 2013 decree restored Article 27 to its previous state and included a similar provision for developing the electrical sector: a market for electricity generation would be established in which private entities could participate, but the control, transmission and distribution would remain an exclusive task of the state as a public service.

By the end of 2014, several decrees transformed the Mexican national electric sector. On 11 August 2014 the following laws were published:

- Electric Industry Law (LIE). Its objective is to regulate the generation, transmission, distribution, and commercialization of the electricity, the planning and control of the national electric system (SEN), and the operation of the wholesale electricity marker (MEM). The law gives further attributions to the Secretary of Energy (SENER) and the Energy Regulatory Commission (CRE) to execute the energy policies. It also supposes the transfer of certain obligations from the Federal Electricity Commission (CFE) to the National Center for Energy Control (CENACE), which becomes independent from CFE, in order to manage the electric system (SEN) and the market (MEM).
- Federal Electricity Commission Law (LCFE). The firm is established as a "productive company" of the state, in order to produce additional value and return of investment through industrial, commercial, or entrepreneurial activities. This contrasts with its previous ordinance in which it only provided electricity as a public service with a fixed budget. This presumes structural changes in the company, creation of new subsidiaries, resulting in more transparency, better bookkeeping, and increase in operational efficiency.
- Regulating Institutions in Energy Matters Law. Establishes the collaboration between the most important government bodies, such as SENER and CENACE, in order to implement the energy policies, and recommend changes to them.
- Other associated laws, such as Geothermic Energy Law, Hydrocarbons Law, Pemex Law.

During this time the SENER published the general rules to obtain and assign clean energy certificates (CEL), which are equivalent to 1 MWh of clean energy, no matter the specific technology. The SENER also mandated that qualified users (big consumers) acquire 5% of their own consumption in CELs for 2018 and 2019. Furthermore, the SENER published simplified rules for interconnection of private generators.

On 30 June 2015 the government presented the Program for Development of the National Electric System (PRODESEN) which establishes a master plan for the electrical system until 2030. On 8 September 2015 the SENER published the first Rules for the Electricity Market establishing the new rights and obligations for the generators, resellers, and qualified users of the market, to be overseen by the CRE and the CENACE. The wholesale electric market officially commenced operations on 1 January 2016.

These reforms meant that in November 2015 the first public offering for private generation and CELs was made, with a decision of the winning bidders being announced on 30 March 2016. After a first round of evaluation, 227 offers were made by 69 private companies, which translated to 18 winning projects from 11 companies, including 84.6% of the requested CELs. The commencement of operation of the winning projects is scheduled to begin on 28 March 2018. The sole buyer of the energy is the CFE.

On 24 December 2015 the Energy Transition Law (LTE) was published, strengthening the integration of renewables into the generation mix. It also establishes ambitious plans for having 35% of renewable energy by 2024, from 28% in 2015 (which includes 18% of hydroelectric energy). After announcing the winners of the first bid, the second public offering for energy was shortly announced, and the resulting decision made in October 2016, in which 28% is renewable energy, mostly photovoltaic and eolic.

The Supreme Court of Justice of the Nation (SCJN) ruled that a May 2020 order by the Secretariat of Energy (SENER) limiting connections to the CFE distribution by private renewable energy producers was unconstitutional.

On 1 February 2021, President Andrés Manuel López Obrador (AMLO) sent an initiative to reform the Electricity Industry Law to the Congress of the Union. The proposal, which must be approved in 30 days, would reverse the energy reform approved under former president Enrique Peña Nieto. There are four priorities: 1) hydroelectric energy, 2) other energy produced by CFE (nuclear, geothermal, thermoelectric, and combined cycle gas turbines), 3) wind and solar energy produced by individuals, and 4) other. AMLO insists that previous reforms were made with the intention of privatizing the energy sector and will require either massive subsidies or huge price increases for consumers.

== Tariffs, Cost Recovery and Subsidies ==
=== Tariffs ===
During the last decade, average electricity tariffs in Mexico have been held below cost with the aim of maintaining macroeconomic and social stability. For all tariffs, an interagency group composed of CFE (Federal Electricity Commission, or Comisión Federal de Electricidad), LFC (Central Light and Power, or Luz y Fuerza del Centro), SHCP (Ministry of Finance and Public Credit, or Secretaria de Hacienda y Crédito Público), SENER (Ministry of Energy, or Secretaria de Energia), CRE (Regulatory Commission of Energy, or Comisión Reguladora de la Energía), and CNA (National Water Commission, or Comisión Nacional del Agua) meet regularly and once a year they prepare a tariff proposal for the subsequent year. Tariffs are approved by SHCP and not by the energy sector regulator.

Except for the tariff set for the agricultural sector, average electricity prices have followed an upward trend since the year 2002. In 2008, average tariffs for the different sectors were:

- Residential: US$0.106/kWh
- Commercial: US$0.255/kWh
- Services: US$0.172/kWh
- Agriculture: US$0.051/kWh
- Industrial: medium industry US$0.153/kWh, large industry US$0.118/kWh

The average tariff, US$0.137/kWh, was 16.5% higher in 2008 when compared to 2007.

=== Subsidies ===
For the industrial and commercial sectors, electricity supply is priced on a rational cost basis for large firms. As a result, they receive no government subsidy, while subsidies for small firms are relatively small. On the other hand, agricultural and residential customers have traditionally received large subsidies since the electricity they consume is significantly underpriced. Extensive subsidies have contributed to a rapid growth in demand. In 2000, the average residential tariff covered only 43% of the costs, while the average tariff for agricultural use covered 31%. Total subsidies amounted to 46% of total electricity sales. In addition, residential subsidies were mostly captured by medium and high income classes as the amount of the subsidy raised with consumption.

In 2002, a restructuring of residential tariffs significantly raised the infra-marginal tariffs paid by middle and especially high consumers of electricity. Currently, billing schedules vary by temperature, season and consumption level. In spite of this reform, price/cost ratio was still under 40% in 2002, even after the 21% increase in price due to the reform. In addition, the share of subsidies going to the non-poor population remained high, estimated at 64%. Agricultural tariffs were also modified in 2003, when a fixed price per kWh was fixed. These new tariffs sought charging higher prices for excess energy use.

The low tariffs, together with LFC's inefficiencies, absorb a large amount of fiscal resources. For 2008, it was estimated that the subsidies paid through electricity tariffs to final CFE and LFC consumers by the Federal Government amounted to US$10 billion (close to 1% of GDP).

== Investment and Financing ==
=== Investment by sub-sector ===
Necessary investment to carry out the 2008-2017 expansion plan amounts to MXN 629,106 million (US$47 billion). The breakdown of the investment is: 41.2% for generation, 21.2% for transmission, 23.9% for distribution, 11.8% for maintenance and 1.9% for other needs.

From the required total, 33.9% corresponds to OFP (Obras Públicas Financiadas or Financed Public Works), 8.8% to Independent Power Production, 51.5% to budgeted works and the remaining 5.9% to financial schemes still to be defined.

=== Financing ===
==== Pidiregas ====
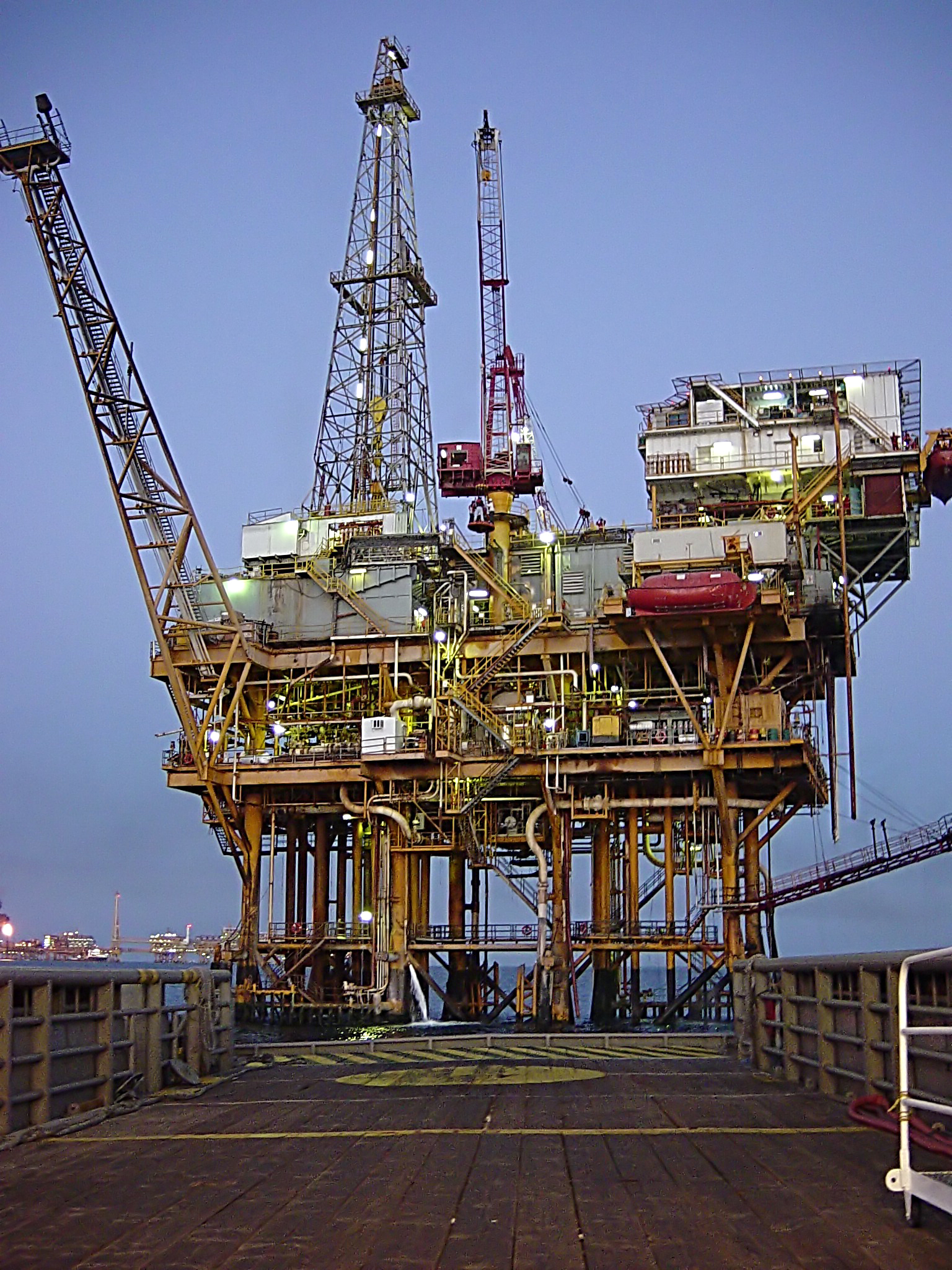
Oil platform in the Campeche Sound

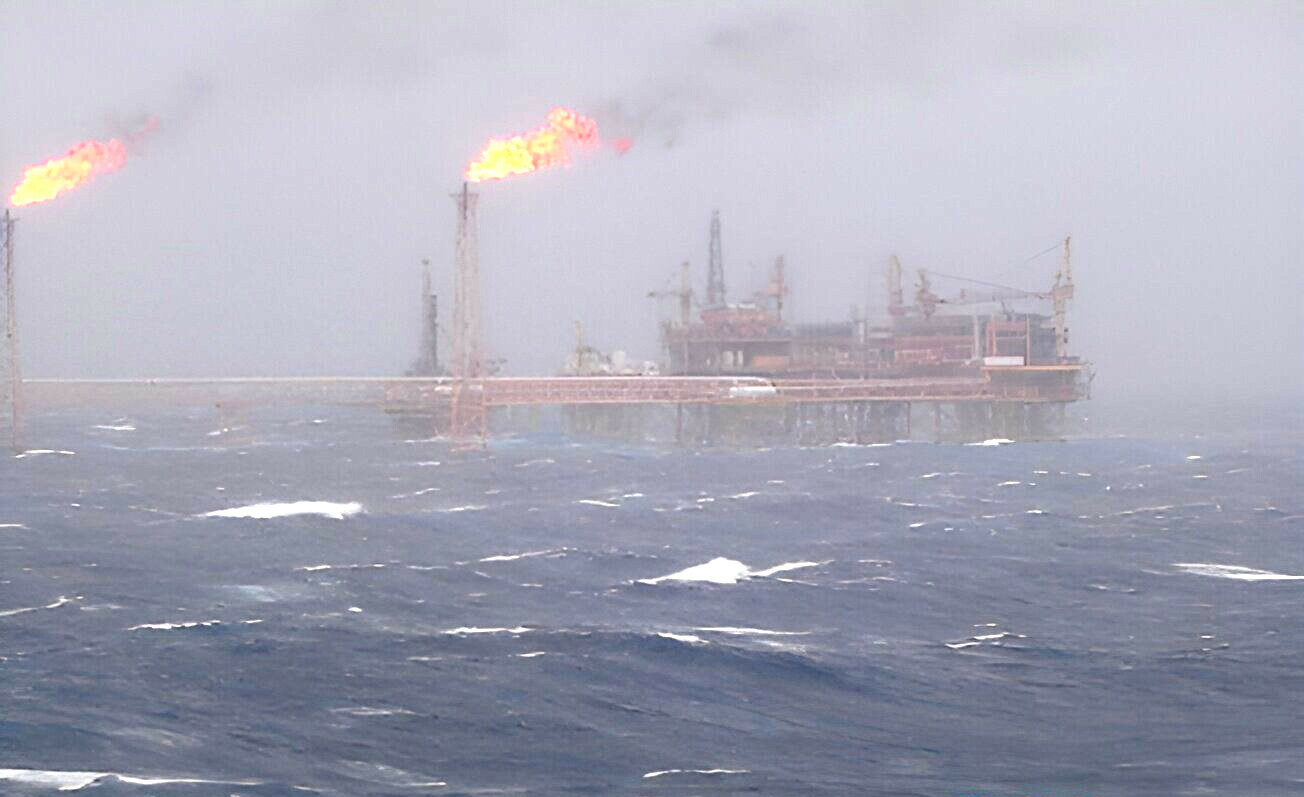
Cantarell RIGS

In 1995-1996 the Mexican government created Pidiregas ("Proyectos de Inversión Diferida En El Registro del Gasto " – Investment Projects with Deferred Expenditure Registration) to finance long-term productive infrastructure projects. Due to budgetary restrictions, the government realized that it could not provide all the resources needed and decided to complement the public sector's efforts with Pidiregas, a deferred financing schedule. This mechanism, which only applied to investments carried out by PEMEX(Petróleos Mexicanos) and CFE aimed to create the conditions for the penetration of private initiatives in hydrocarbon exploration and electricity generation. Pidiregas have been extended and have also grown in amount (PEMEX uses them for as much as four times the amount of CFE), although the original motivation for their existence is gone.

Following a project finance scheme, for a project to be executed under Pidiregas, the resources that it generates from the sale of goods and services have to be enough to cover the incurred financial obligations. Projects are paid with the revenues generated during their operation and require the signature of a contract in which a product or work is involved. The State assumes the risk since PEMEX or CFE sign the contract as guarantee, while the investors recover their investment in the agreed time. As a result, Pidiregas cannot be considered as true private investment since, under true private sector participation, firms would make investment decisions and bear the full risk. The viability of the program has been questioned as its effect in the public budget is similar to the emission of public debt. Furthermore, until 2006, the Pidigeras scheme resulted in losses.

==== Grid extension ====
Since 1995, states and municipalities hold the responsibility for the planning and financing of grid extension and off-grid supply. A large part of the investment is financed through FAIS (Fund to Support Social Infrastructure). The National Commission for Indigenous People and SEDESOL (Secretariat for Social Development) also finance an important share of grid extension. Once a particular system has been constructed, its assets and operational and financial responsibility are transferred to CFE.

Recent studies have concluded that interconnecting Baja California with the National Interconnected System (SIN) would be both a technically and economically sound decision. This interconnection would allow to serve peak demand in the Baja California system with generation resources from the SIN. Conversely, in period of low demand in Baja California, surplus electricity and base load (i.e. geothermal and combined cycles) could be exported to the SIN. As a result, there would be a reduction of investment costs in generation infrastructure and of total production costs. In addition, the interconnection would open new opportunities for electricity exchanges with power utilities in Western United States through the existing transmission links with California. It is expected that the interconnection will be commissioned in 2013.

==== Renewable energy ====
The Renewable Energy Law creates a Fund for the Energy Transition and the Sustainable Use of Energy. This fund will assure the financing of projects evaluated and approved by the Technical Committee, chaired by SENER. The fund will begin with US$200 million for each year between 2009 and 2011.

== Summary of private participation in the electricity sector ==
As required by the Constitution, the electricity sector in Mexico remains federally owned, with the Comisión Federal de Electricidad (CFE) essentially controlling the whole sector. Although generation was opened to private participation in 1992, CFE is still the dominant player, with two-thirds of installed capacity.

Activity	Private participation (%)
Generation	25% of installed capacity
Transmission	0%
Distribution	0%

== Electricity and the environment ==
=== Responsibility for the environment ===
The Secretariat of Environment and Natural Resources (SEMARNAT), created in 2000 from the previous Secretariat of Environment, Natural Resources and Fishing (SEMARNAP) holds the responsibilities for the environment in Mexico.

SEMARNAT was one of the government agencies within the Intersectoral Commission for Climate Change that elaborated Mexico's Climate Change Strategy.

=== Greenhouse gas emissions ===
According to Mexico's Third National Communication to the UNFCCC, the country emitted 643 million tons of carbon dioxide equivalent (Mt CO_{2}e) in 2002, of which almost 400 Mt CO_{2}e resulted from the combustion of fossil fuels (over 60 percent of total emissions). The sources of Mexico's GHG emissions are energy generation (24%), transport (18%), forests and land-use change (14%), waste management (10%), manufacturing and construction (8%), industrial processes (8%), agriculture (7%), fugitive emissions (6%), and other uses (5%).

=== Climate change mitigation ===
Although the Kyoto Protocol does not require Mexico to reduce its GHG emissions, the country has committed to reduce its emissions voluntarily. In May 2007, President Calderón announced the National Climate Change Strategy which focuses on climate change as a central part of Mexico's national development policy. The ENACC sets the long-term climate change agenda for the country, together with medium to long-term goals for adaptation and mitigation. In December 2008, Mexico announced that it would reduce its GHG emissions by 50% below 2002 levels by 2050.

In June 2009, the Government of Mexico formally committed itself to a detailed long-term plan for emission reductions embedded in the Special Climate Change Program (PECC) that provides an accounting of emissions by sector, creates a framework for monitoring improvements and establishes a legally binding blueprint for emission reduction initiatives, sector by sector. The PECC sets out a four pillar program that includes (i) a long-term vision for government action; (ii) sectoral plans for GHG mitigation; (iii) plans for adaptation; and (iv) cross-cutting policy initiatives.

==== Carbon Capture and storage ====
Mexico highly depends on the burning of its fossil fuels, and for the same reason, it is in its interest to look into mitigation solutions for its corresponding emissions. In the General Law on Climate Change on 2012, Mexico promised to reduce 20% of its greenhouse gas (GHG) emissions by 2020 and 50% by 2050, as well as in the Paris Agreement. 19% of this new mitigation plan will be dedicated to carbon capture and storage and specifically 10% to the energy industry.

=== CDM projects in electricity ===
In September 2009, there are 47 energy-related registered CDM projects in Mexico with a total emission reduction potential of about 3.5 million tons of CO_{2} equivalent. The table below presents the number of projects by type:

Project type	Number	Estimated annual emission reductions (ktons CO_{2}e)
Hydro	3	119
Cogeneration	1	261
Methane recovery and electricity generation	32	899
Wind	8	2,242
Wastewater treatment	2	19

Source: United Nations Framework Convention on Climate Change

== External assistance ==
=== World Bank ===
Currently, the World Bank is contributing funds and assistance through several projects related to the energy sector in Mexico.

- A Rural Electrification Project with a US$15 million grant from GEF and a US$15 million World Bank loan is currently in the pipeline. This US$110 million project is focused in the design and implementation of sustainable energy models for areas without access to the electricity network. The project includes 50,000 households in Oaxaca, Guerrero and Veracruz.
- In October 2006, GEF financing was approved for the US$49.35 million Agua Prieta Hybrid Solar Thermal Power Plant. This project, located in the northern state of Sonora, will contribute to reduce GHG emissions through the installation of an Integrated Solar Combined Cycle System (ISCCS) using solar parabolic technology.
- A Large-Scale Renewable Energy Development Project was approved in June 2006. This two-phase project will receive a US$25.35 million grant from GEF, while the remaining $US 125 million will be financed by local and private sources. The project seeks to assist Mexico in developing initial experience in commercially based, grid-connected renewable energy applications. It will do so by supporting the construction of an approximately 101 megawatt independent power producer (IPP) wind farm, designated as "La Venta III".
- The Prototype Carbon Fund approved in December 2006 a US$12.29 million investment loan for a Wind Umbrella Project.
- A US$5.8 million GEF grant was approved in October 2002 for the Introduction of Climate Friendly Measures in Transport. The project, with a total budget of US$12.2 million, has will contribute to the establishment of policies that will assist towards a long-term modal shift in a climate-friendly, more efficient and less polluting, less carbon-intensive transport for the Mexico City Metropolitan Area (MCMA).

=== IDB ===
Currently, four IDB financed energy activities are under implementation in Mexico.

- In August 2009, a US$1 million non-reimbursable technical cooperation support to the National Program for Sustainable Energy Use
- In September 2008, a US$749,000 non-reimbursable technical cooperation was approved to support the implementation of a pilot initiative to use alternative energy sources and implement energy efficiency measures. This technical cooperation is still awaiting implementation.
- In May 2007, US$200,000 was approved to finance a project that aims at providing Assistance to CFE on Environmental and Social Aspects of Hydroelectric Projects. This US$1,168,000 project aims to assess CFE performance and management capability in dealing with environmental and social impacts of large hydroelectric projects.
- Financing for the Support for the Energy Secretariat on the Feasibility of Bio-Ethanol as Fuel was approved in August 2005. The US$146,000 provided by the IDB are complemented with US$30,000 from the country. The broad objective of the project is assessing the competitiveness of ethanol as a fuel.

== Sources ==
- Carreón and Jimenez, 2003. The Mexican Electricity Sector: Economic, Legal and Political Issues.
- SENER, 2006. Prospectiva del sector eléctrico 2006-2015.
- SENER & GTZ, 2006. Energías renovables para el desarrollo sustentable en México.
- SENER, 2009. Prospectiva del sector eléctrico 2008-2017.
- SENER, 2009. Programa Especial para el Aprovechamiento de Energías Renovables.
- SENER, 2015. Prospectiva del sector eléctrico 2015-2029.
- World Bank, 2004. Energy Policies and the Mexican Economy.
- World Bank, 2004. Mexico: public expenditure review, Volume II: Main report.
- World Bank, 2005. Mexico: infrastructure public expenditure review (IPER).

== See also ==
- Mexico
- Economy of Mexico
- Energy in Mexico
- Renewable energy in Mexico
- Wind power in Mexico
- Solar power in Mexico
- Petroleum industry in Mexico
- Water supply and sanitation in Mexico
- Renewable energy by country
