= Renewable energy in Mexico =

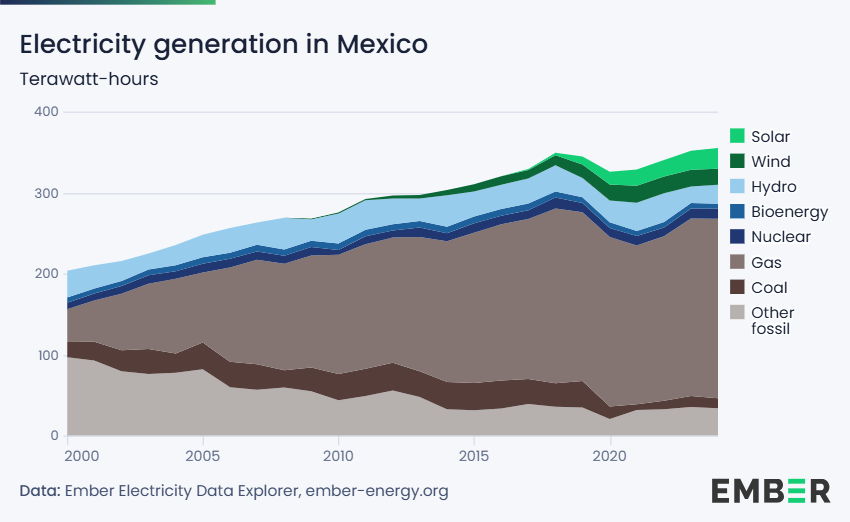
Electricity generation in Mexico in terawatt-hours

Renewable energy in Mexico contributes to 26 percent of electricity generation in Mexico. As of 2009, electricity generation from renewable energy comes from biomass, hydro power, geothermal, solar power and wind. There is a long term effort established to increase the use of renewable energy sources. The amount of geothermal energy used and harvested, places Mexico as number four in the world.

== History of renewable energy in Mexico ==
Support for each specific form of renewable energy. Poll done in 2011 regarding civilian ranking of importance.

In May 2020 President Andrés Manuel López Obrador canceled solar and wind energy contracts to supply electrical power for the government, citing high costs for consumers while oil prices were low and citizens were suffering from high unemployment due to the COVID-19 pandemic. Environmentalists and investors have both criticized the move. The President defended his actions by citing high profits, high costs, and corruption related to the contracts, and he insisted he was not anti-renewable energy.

== Current policies: protocols and initiatives ==
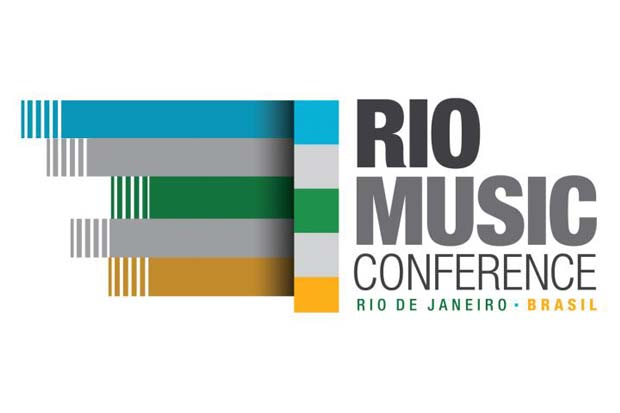

A great deal of new and innovative techniques and ideas have been implemented globally as countries on an international context gain momentum in the realms of green energy. Mexico specifically gained major momentum for this shortly after the Rio Conference in 1992. The Rio Conference is also known as the Earth Summit. It is a rapidly growing conference, especially within the last 20 years. It was located in Brazil and included 172 number of government participants. 108 of these are at a head of state or government level. The Earth Summits goal is to transform the attitudes and minds of people, into a more global change focus for the future preservation of the world. One of the first major changes for renewable energy was that Mexico's public electricity service law was revised. The revision allowed the participation of private entities within the process of electricity generation. This change impacted “self-supply of electricity, co-generation (production of electricity from waste heat for self-supply), small electricity production (under 30 MW for sale to the national electric utility CFE), and independent power production for exclusive sale to CFE” as according to the International Energy Agency. In the past a total number of 4000 MN in permits have been awarded by Energy Regulatory Commission. These permits included bio-gas to electricity, small hydro, solar and wind farms. Furthermore, a grid connection contract for renewable energy was created in 2001. This in essence was a set of rules on detailing transmission charges relating to the transmitting or feeding in to the national grid. This change impacted solar, wind and small hydroelectric installations. It allowed for the grid to hold the amount of clean green energy to generate enough power to source energy during peak local times.

Another implementation from Mexico's past was motion to establish service charges for the transmission of renewable electricity in 2003. This in essence was an issue to require the owners of transmissions to connect the generators under the same standard set of requirements and conditions. Which allowed for a standardized process and timeline for interconnecting them. More recently ratification of the IRENA Statue, a National Energy strategy was created throughout 2011/2012. This was joining the International Renewable Energy Agency and Mexico's own Ministry of Energy, where a collective agreement was to reduce coal demand by 62% and aim to generate 46% of total energy needed through renewable sources. While some of these are more within the last two decades, they are the laws and regulations that have formed Mexico's renewable energy to what it is today. These changes allowed Mexico to rank number four globally for renewable energy.

In 2025, Mexico required that new solar and wind facilities must include 30% batteries, equivalent to 3 hours of power production.

== Sources of renewable energy in Mexico ==
The main forms of renewable energy used in Mexico are hydropower, biomass, geothermal, solar power and wind. While all of these are assisting in lowering the fossil fuel count and carbon emissions.

Mexico announced in July 2026 a $42.3 billion plan to add 32,000 megawatts of electricity to its grid by 2030. Of that total, 22,000 megawatts will come from solar, wind and geothermal.

Hydropower

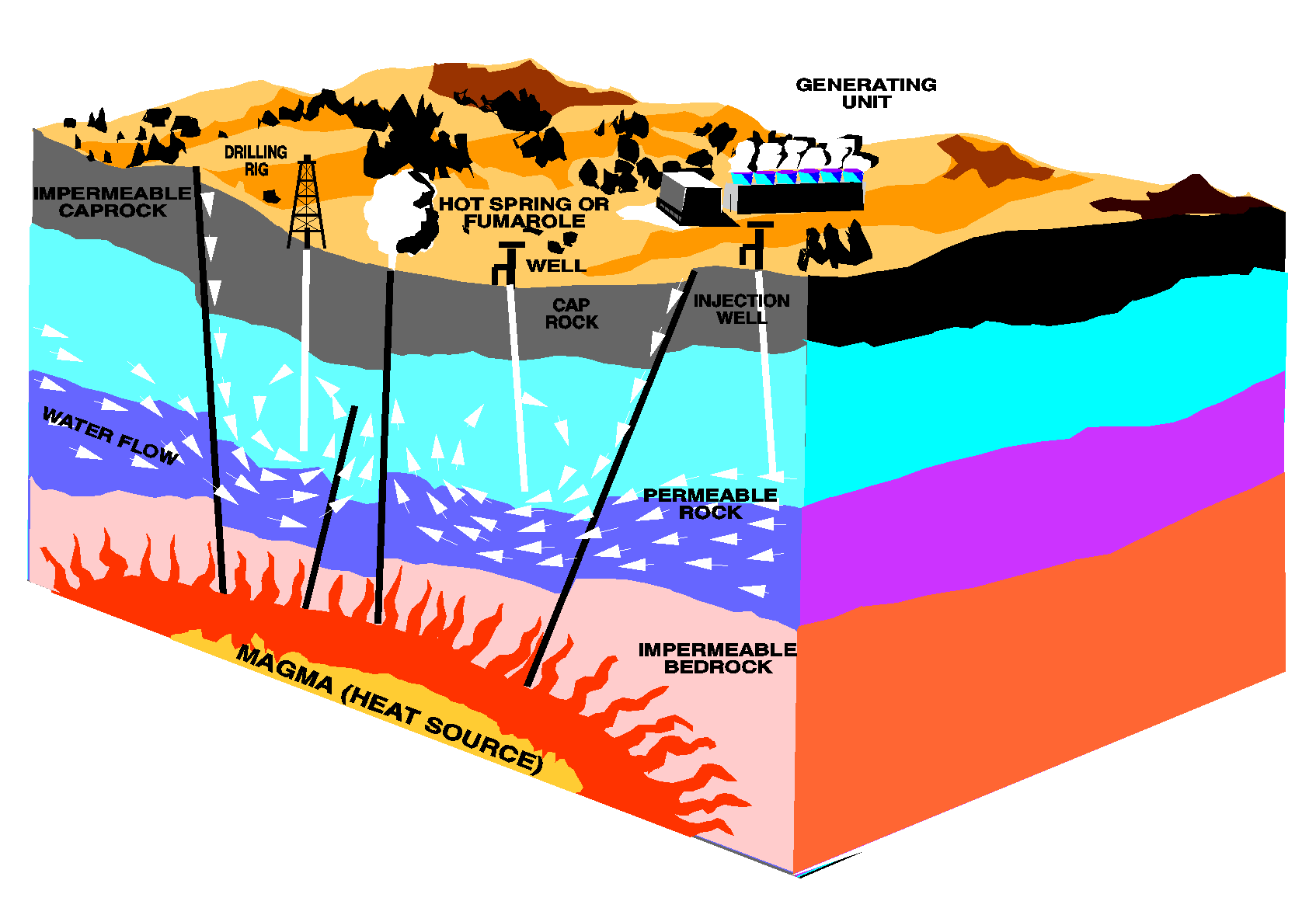
Geothermal energy image.

Firstly, hydropower. Hydropower is often also referred to as hydro energy. This is the process of receiving energy, by storing water in dams and from flowing rivers. It is mentioned first before other sources as it is the most prominent in Mexico. It provides a power capacity of 11,603 MW. This course of action is more prominent in developing countries rich in water sources. While the source does contribute a lot to total energy produced, it is rapidly growing as a form of renewable energy.

Geothermal

Geothermal energy uses the Earth's core heat as a form of energy. It can be generated from hot water to the molten rock miles beneath the surface of the Earth. Geothermal is the second most common and used sources in Mexico. It contributed nearly 958 MW towards Mexico's renewable energy. Geothermal contributes to 9.3% of the total global renewable energy.

Solar power

Solar power is usually the most commonly heard and associated when one hears the term “renewable energy”. It is generated by the heat produced from the Sun, absorbed through solar panels, and transferred directly to renewable green energy. This is considered the most efficient and convenient for Mexico. This is because it is located directly on the global solar belt. In addition, Mexico has a large landmass, meaning solar panels could be constructed and covering many of the open spaces.

Wind power

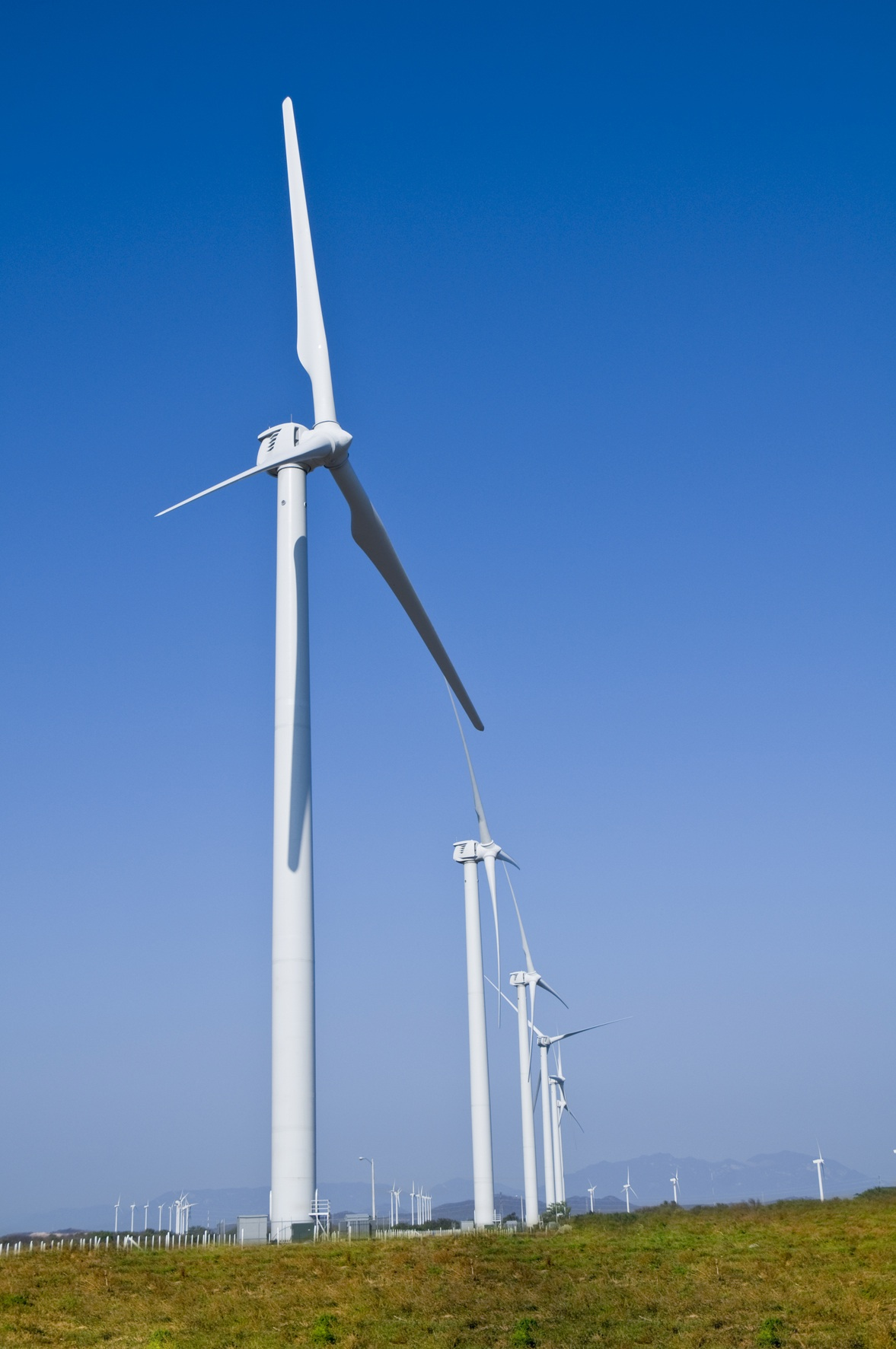
Example of Wind Farm in Oaxaca, Mexico.

Wind energy, is the process of converting the naturally occurring wind into energy. This can be done through the use of wind turbines. In Mexico it is concentrated within five major regions. This allows for funding and manpower to be allocated to the most efficient positions within the country.

Biomass

Lastly the most common form of renewable energy in Mexico is biomass. Biomass is the fuel developed from organic materials. Due to the fact that this is the most common form, the most energy and time has been invested in it. Investments are mainly done with research and publications. This is considered a primary source, although it has had a steady decline as the other forms of renewable energy become more used and researched.

== Predictions and current research ==
While many predict that Latin America will dominate the solar energy production, Mexico is predicted to use this method the most. While it is one of the least common sources at the time (2015), solar has begun to increase at rapid speed. It is said that if this form was fully tapped it could be the only form needed. That should this method be truly invested and implemented, it would supply enough energy to generate the energy needed. What is halting this currently, is the economic factors associated with implementing the resources needed to draw solar energy. Mainly solar panels, these currently have a price tag that makes it hard to globally define this source. The boom in 2016 was set on due to a hike in electricity prices. Predictions state that a decrease in the prices will occur in 2017, and from there further development can occur. At this point it is internationally viewed as an untapped resource. With Mexico lacking in the development of this resource, it lowers Mexico's global ranking. The standstill of this is due to the very high import taxes of these panels. Perhaps the initiative to invest in the manufacturing of solar panels within the country could be the solution to the issue. Not only would the absolve importing issues and complications, but it would also generate income for the country. Not only income in the country, but it allows for a major source of jobs. Jobs could potentially be created in all realms of development. Job development would occur in the following forms; manufacturing/production, assembly on land, maintenance workers, and administrative workers to work with relaying this clean energy to the public. Mexico has made a pledge INDC to reduce emissions by 40% by 2030. This was a global pledge for participating countries. Current predictions based on information at this time indicates that by 2030, renewable energy will make up 21% of total energy used. This is an improvement of nearly 15% since 2005.

== Concerns and possible complications ==
Although there has been a level of growth within the field, ambitious goals and targets have been set by government officials. The Mexican government has set targets of 25% by 2018, 30% by 2021, 35% by 2024, and finally an ultimate target of 50%by 2050. With the current standings falling approximately 22% mid-2017, the goal is attainable for the following year. With these specific targets set, a tremendous amount of growth has occurred in order to keep up the demand.

"Procurement opportunities in this newly energized market will take shape in one of four forms:

(i) selling power directly to suppliers or qualified users (large electricity users who buy power from the National Center of Energy Control (CENACE) or suppliers at non-regulated rates);

(ii) selling power to the wholesale electricity market;

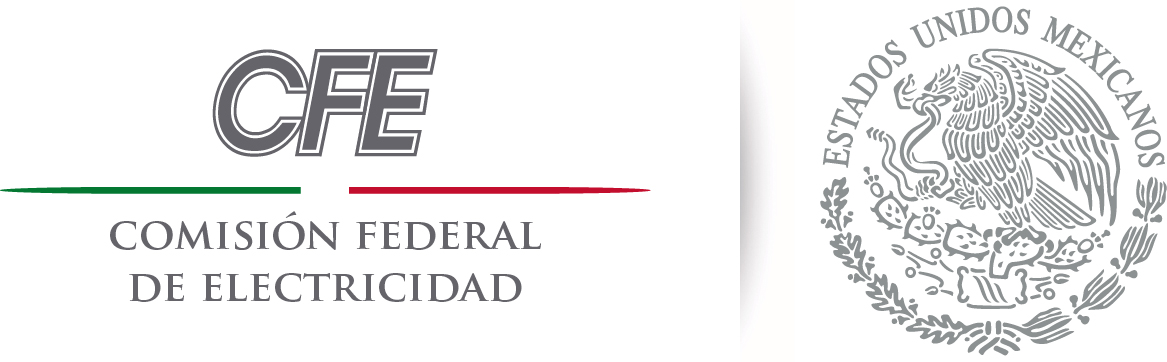
Comisión Federal de Electricidad (CFE) official logo

(iii) participating in the long-term auctions for service and capacity supply;

(iv) partnering with Commission Federal de Electricidad (CFE) or its subsidiaries for projects".

Directly from www.renewableenergy.com

A main concern is the reaction and support on the economic, social, and political platforms. The implementation of specific laws to govern these concepts are still in the process of being developed. An area extra consideration should be taken is the specific landowners and members of the community. By incorporating the opinion of these individuals, a more collective agreement and stance will occur. These are the members of the country who will making the implantation and execution of these plans. In addition, a higher level of education and information should be given to the members of the country. By adding this information to the public, it will create a higher level of cohesiveness towards future plans. In summation, while these goals are ambitious, with the correct action and rollout of something new, they are attainable. The ability to be able to adapt to future setbacks and hiccups is crucial in a strong future for energy in Mexico.

== See also ==
- Solar power in Mexico
- Wind power in Mexico
- Electricity sector in Mexico#Renewable Energy Resources
- Energy in Mexico
- Renewable energy by country
