= Wind power in Mexico =

External images
- Oaxaca Wind Resource Map
- Northwestern Mexico Border Areas - 50m Wind Power

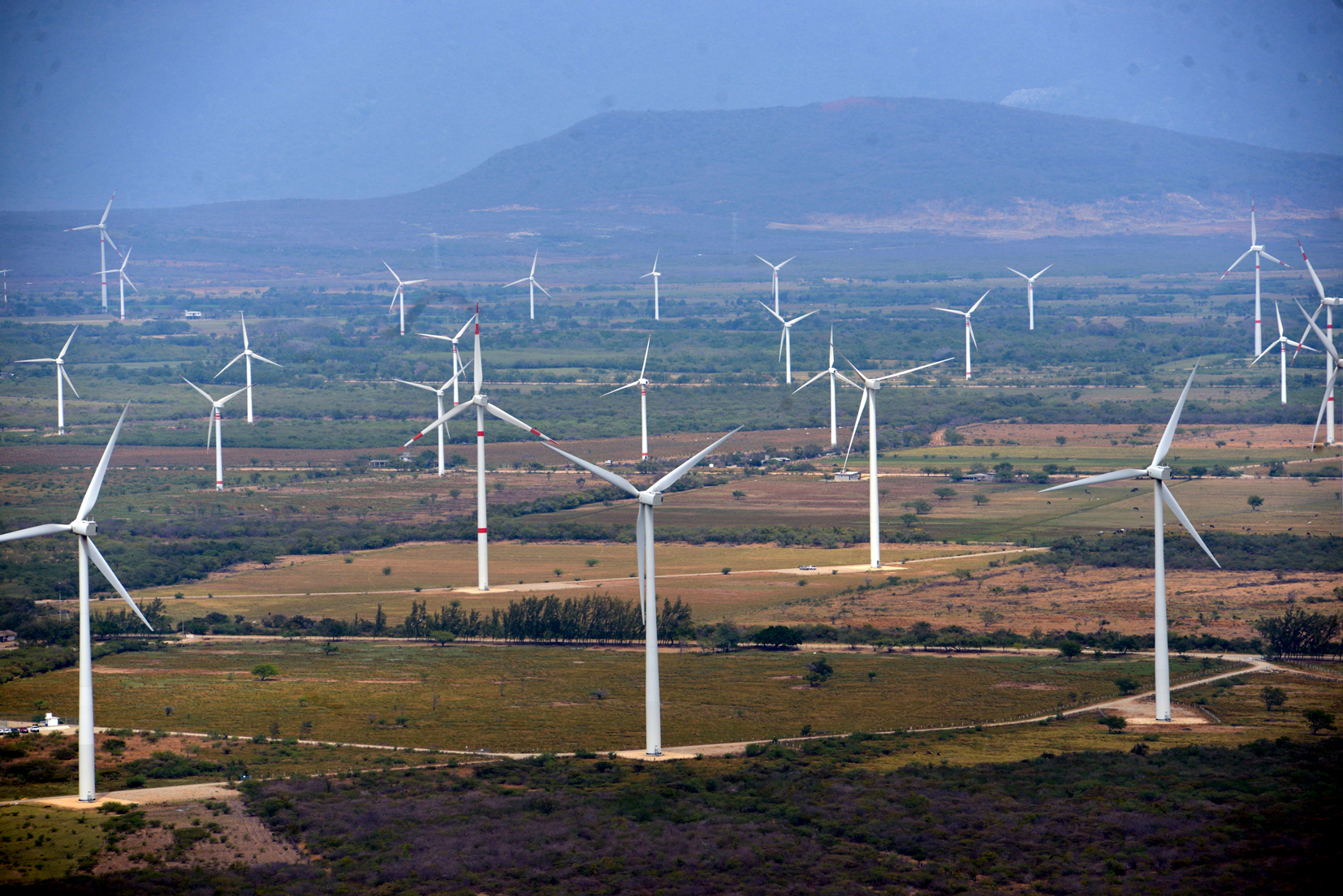
The Central Eólica Sureste I, Fase II in Oaxaca

Mexico is rapidly growing its production of wind power. In 2016, its installed capacity had reached 3,527 MW, increasing to 8,128 MW in 2020.

In 2008, there were three wind farms in the country. The Eurus Wind Farm was the largest wind farm in Latin America. 18 of 27 wind farms construction projects were based in La Ventosa in the Isthmus of Tehuantepec in Oaxaca, also referred to as the wind farm corridor. According to the Mexican Wind Energy Association, Mexico was predicted to progress to rank twentieth worldwide in wind capacity by the end of 2012, and to produce four percent of the country's total electricity production. It also projected that the nation would have 12 GW (16,000,000 hp) of wind generation capacity by 2020, and would be able to provide fifteen percent of Mexico's production. Brian Gardner, Economist Intelligence Unit's energy analyst, said, "With strong wind through the south, consistent sunlight in the north and a stable market, Mexico is well positioned for continued renewables growth". Wind power is in partial competition with solar power in Mexico.

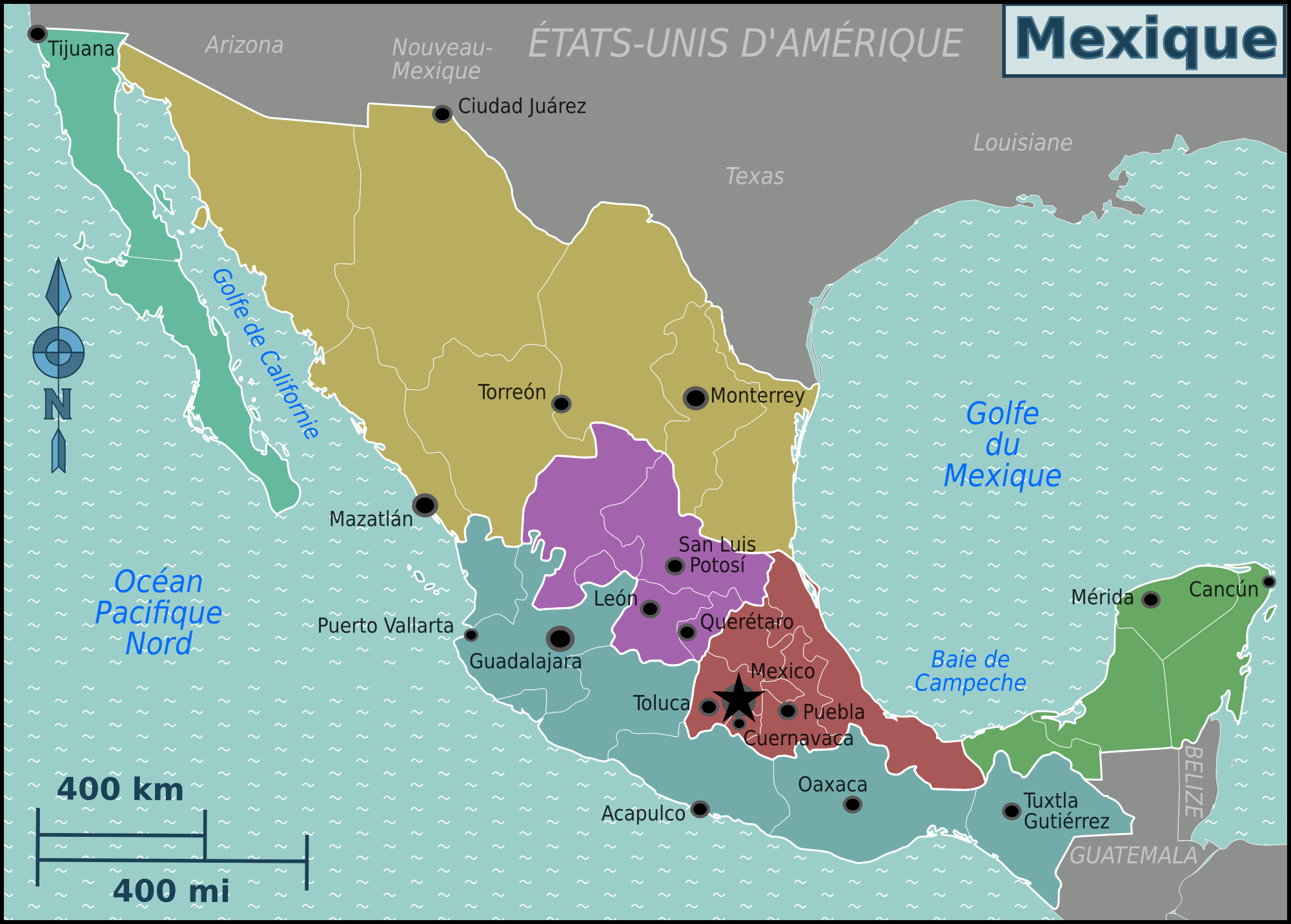
Regions of Mexico

== Resource Availability ==
Mexico's wind availability is high, with some areas in the south producing average wind speeds upwards of 10 m/s. However, while the country has ample wind, it lacks incentives to build the infrastructure to harness it. Oaxaca has become the central point from which wind power is expanding, due to its ideal geography, specifically its topography. Its isthmus separates the area's eastern mountain chain, the Sierra de Chiapas, from its western mountain chains, the Sierra de Oaxaca and Sierra Madre del Sur, creating a tunnel effect through which strong winds flow. According to the Wind Energy Atlas of Oaxaca, if the useable area of Oaxaca alone were occupied with turbines to its capacity, it is estimated that upwards of 44GW could be produced.

== Statistics ==
Wind generation capacity by year in Mexico
Installed wind power generation capacity
since 2015 (MW)

== See also ==
- Renewable energy in Mexico
- Solar power in Mexico
- Electricity sector in Mexico
- Renewable energy by country
