= Eurus Wind Farm =

Wind farm in Mexico

- Country: Mexico
- Location: Juchitán de Zaragoza, Oaxaca, Mexico
- Coordinates: 16°32′25″N 94°57′14″W
- Status: Operational
- Construction cost: US$550 million

Wind farm
- Type: Onshore

Power generation
- Units operational: 167
- Nameplate capacity: 250.5 MW

The Eurus Wind Farm is a wind farm located in Juchitán de Zaragoza, Oaxaca, Mexico. The largest wind farm in Latin America, the partnership between Cemex and Acciona Energia cost US$550 million to build. Its 167 wind turbines combine to generate 250.5 megawatts (MW), sufficient power to supply about half a million people. By contrast with traditional means of power, it may reduce annual carbon dioxide emissions by 600,000 metric tons.

== See also ==
- List of onshore wind farms
- Wind power in Mexico
