= Solar power in Mexico =

- Installed capacity: 11.99 GW (2024) (18th)
- Annual generation: 27.55 TWh (2024)
- Capacity per capita: 92 W (2024)
- Share of electricity: 7.6% (2024)

Solar power in Mexico contributes 27.55 TWh of generation to the Mexican grid, accounting for 7.6% of total electric power generation as of 2024. Mexico has 11.99 GW of installed capacity, up from 0.18 GW in 2016.

Solar power has the potential to produce vast amounts of energy. 70% of the country has an insolation of greater than 4.5 kWh/m^{2}/day. Using 15% efficient photovoltaics, a square 25 km (16 mi) on each side in the state of Chihuahua or the Sonoran Desert (0.01% of Mexico) could supply all of Mexico's electricity.

== History ==
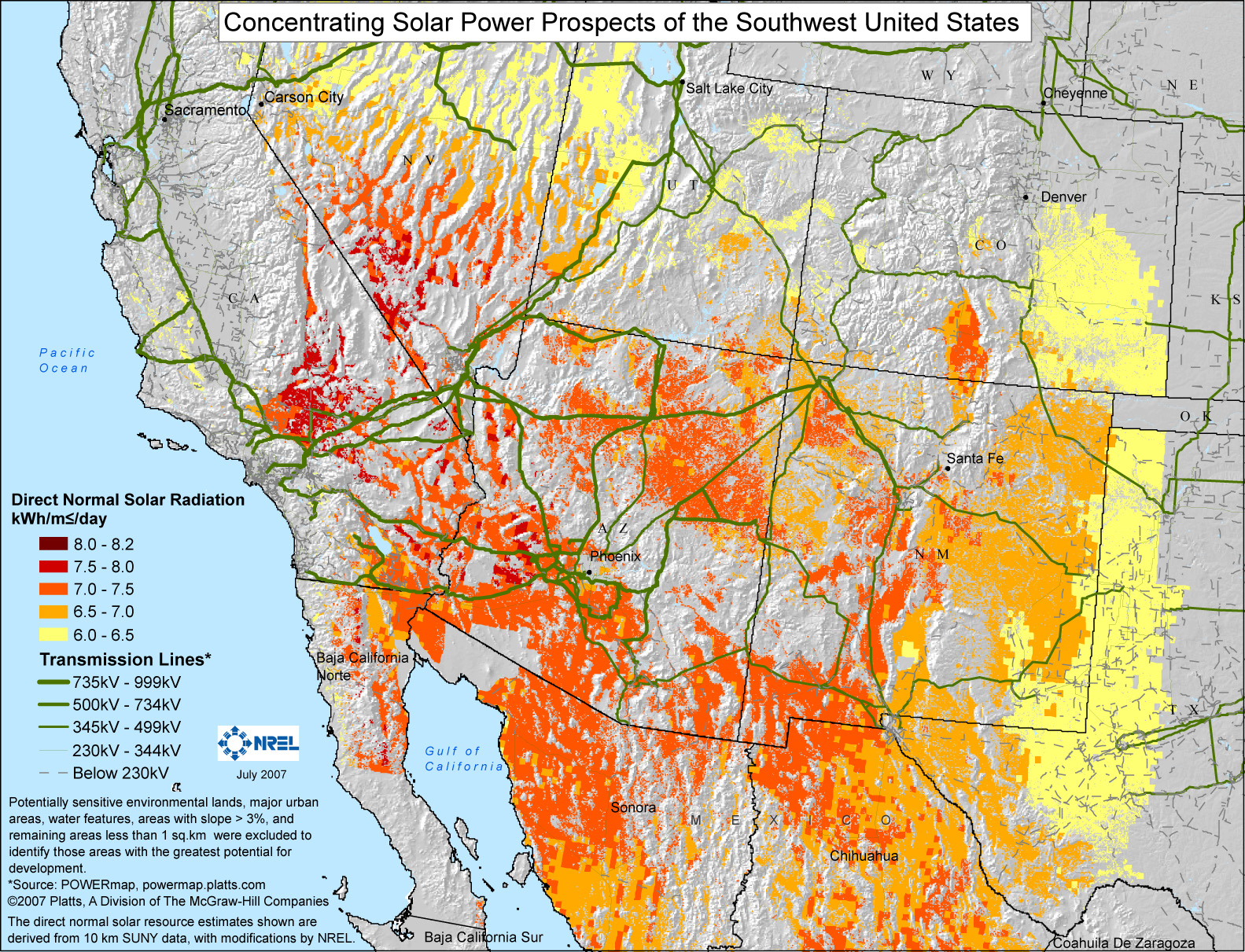
Concentrated solar power prospects for southwest United States and northern Mexico

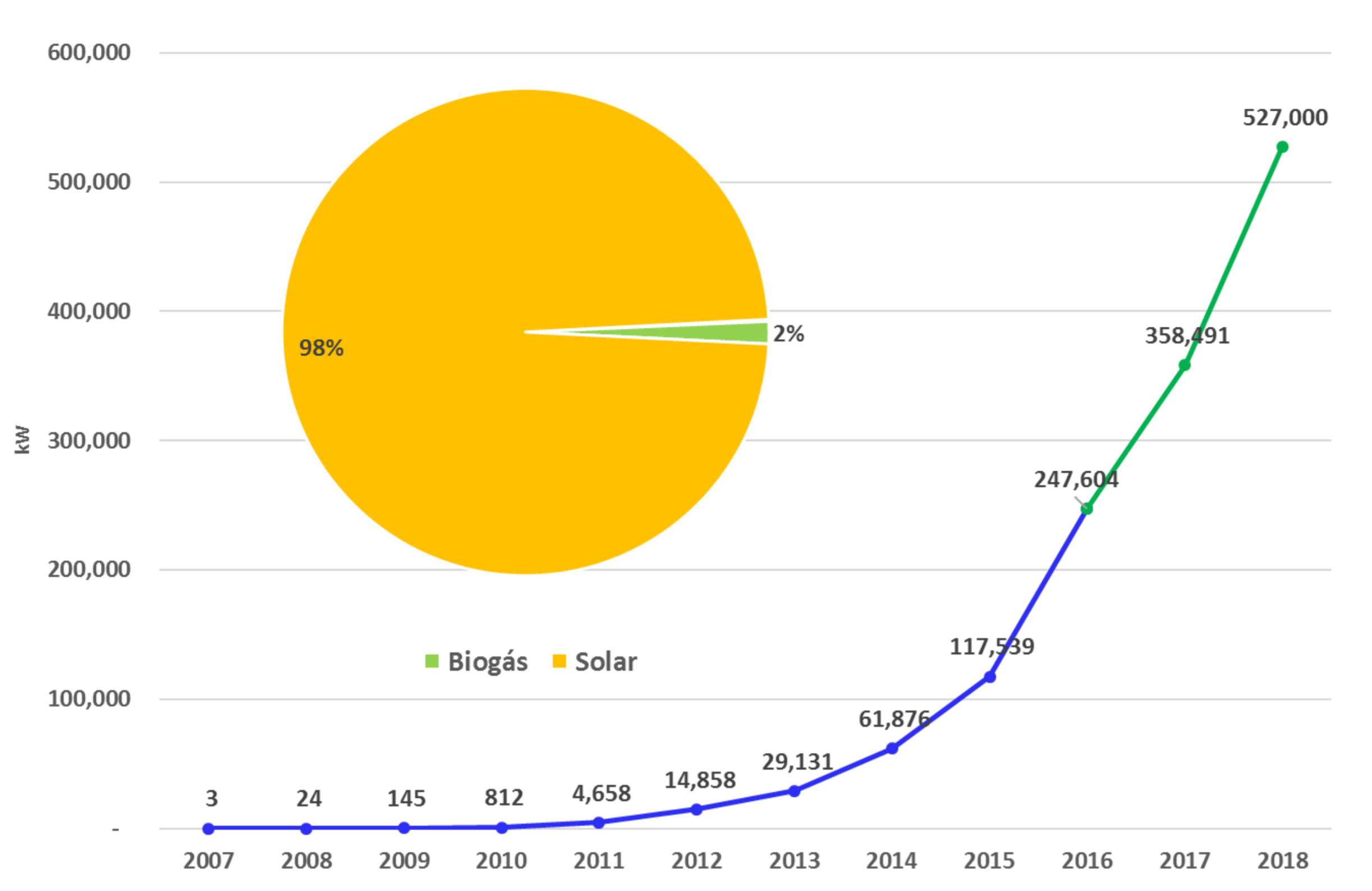
Installed capacity of total distributed clean energy in Mexico. The blue line represents current growth in capacity and the green line are projections made by Mexico's Special Program for Energy Transition.

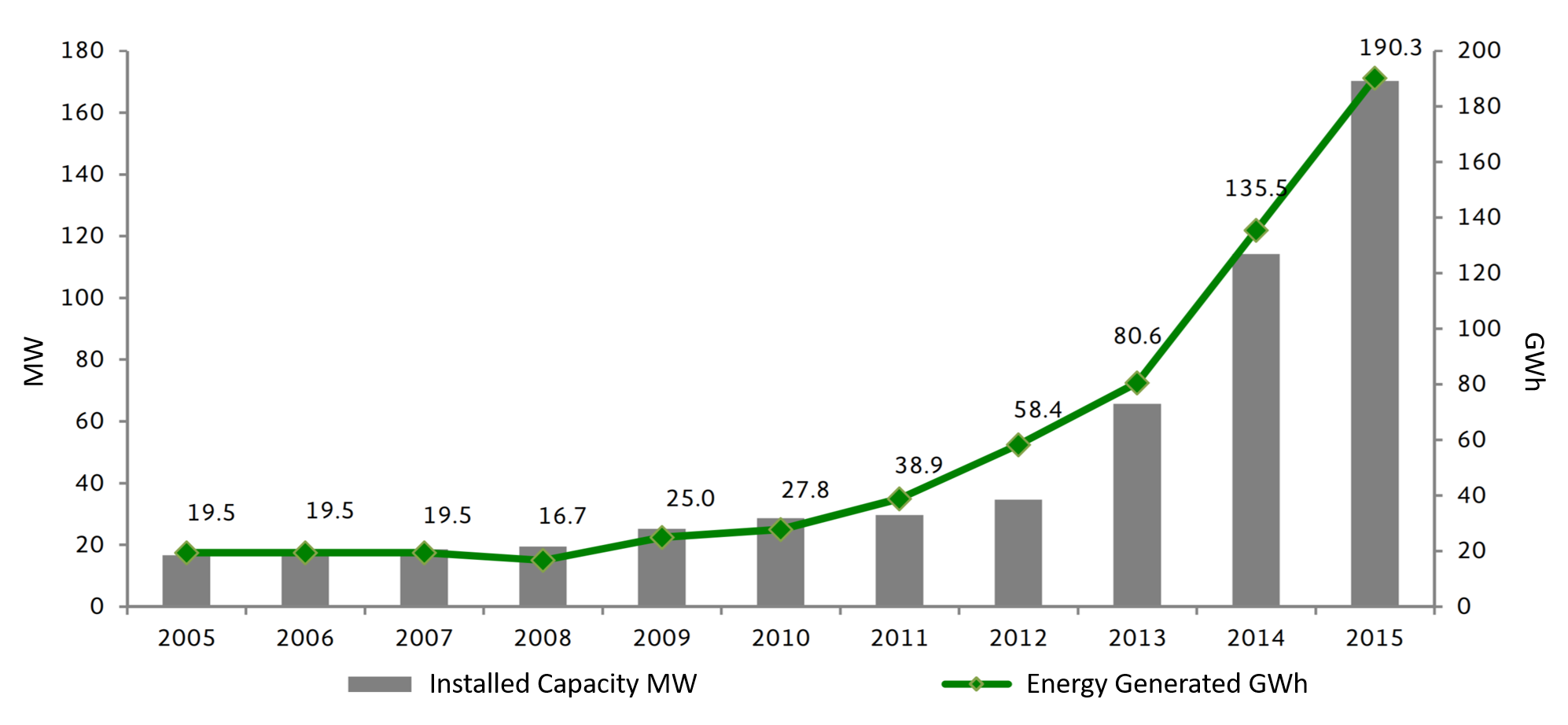
Historic progress of installed PV solar capacity and generation in Mexico

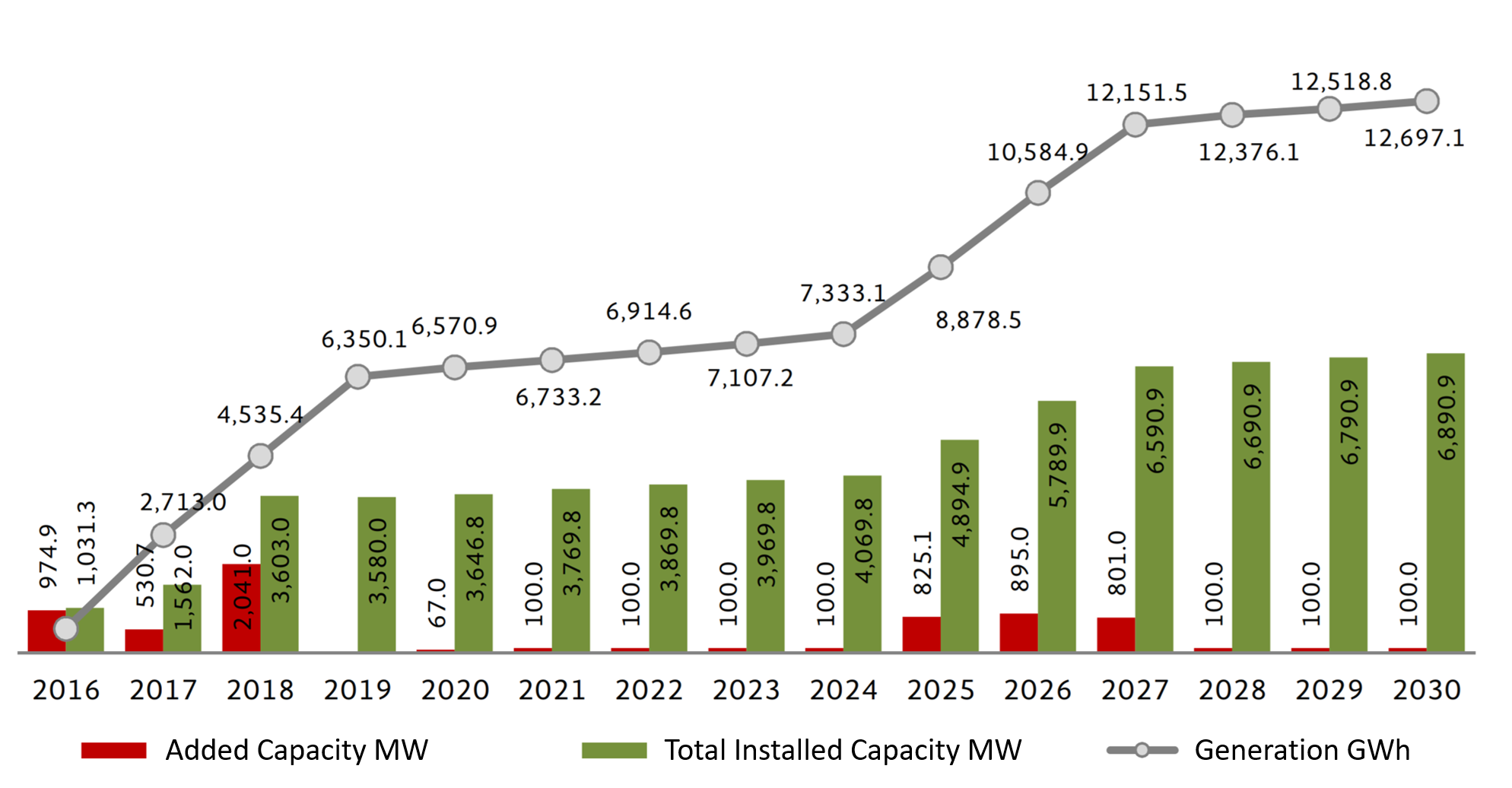
Future growth for current and added solar PV installed capacity and generation from 2016 to 2030

A law requiring 35% of electricity from renewable resources by 2024 and carbon emission reductions of 50% below 2000 levels by 2050 was introduced in 2012. Combined with declining solar installation costs, it was estimated that the 2012 climate law would lead to 6 GW of solar capacity in Mexico by 2020. At the Solar Power Mexico conference, it was said that PV electricity and solar thermal would comprise up to 5% of Mexico's energy by 2030 and up to 10% by 2050. The first long term energy auction was held in 2015 with a second one in 2016. Solar PV was successful in both, securing 1,691 MW of the 2,085 MW auctioned in the first and 1573 MW of 3473 MW in the second auction.

In 2013, 22% of the installed electricity generation capacity in Mexico was from renewable sources. The majority, 18.1%, comes from hydroelectricity, 2.5% from wind power and 0.1% from solar PV. In December 2013, the Mexican government passed a constitutional reform that effectively opened the energy sector to private investment, both for electricity generation and petroleum exploration and extraction. The Reform's goal was to modernize the sector by optimizing the use of national resources and incentivizing renewable energy through clean energy certificates. The Reform liberalized the electricity sector and brought forth a wholesale electricity market. Long and medium term auctions are the main mechanisms used to incentivize capacity and energy growth. Clean energy certificates are created by the participation of renewables and are meant to support energy generated from low carbon emitting sources. A long term energy action secures a 15-year contract for energy and capacity supplied whereas medium term generates a three-year contract.

At a clean source auction in 2016, solar won 1,860 MW at an average price of $50.7 per MWh (ranging between $35 and $67). The production was expected to be 4 TWh per year. Other electric power generation sources such as gas, hydro and geothermal received no awards, and wind power won a smaller share than solar.

== Production ==
Historically, the main applications of solar energy technologies in Mexico have been for non-electric active solar system applications for space heating, water heating and drying crops. As in most countries, wind power development preceded solar power initially, due to the lower installation cost. Since solar power is not available during the night, and because wind power tends to be complementary to solar, a mix of both can be expected. Both require substantial storage to compensate for days with no wind and no sun. Batteries provide short-term storage, and pumped hydroelectricity provides longer-term storage.

=== Projects ===
The Villanueva Solar plant is the largest in Mexico with 310 MW installed by mid-2018. When completed, it will be the largest in the Americas at 828 MW.

Another large installation, Don José Solar Farm was completed in May 2018 Initially at 238 MW, a 22 MW expansion project was immediately announced.

A 405 MWp (megawatt-peak) photovoltaic project in Puerto Libertad, Sonora was completed in December, 2018. Originally planned to be 39 MW, the size was increased to allow generation of approximately 963 GWh (gigawatt-hours) of electricity per year.

A solar trough based 14 MW plant will use a combined cycle gas turbine of 478 MW to provide electricity to the city of Agua Prieta, Sonora. The World Bank has financed this project with US$50 million. A 450 MW concentrated photovoltaics plant is planned for Baja California.

== Distributed generation ==
Currently, 98% of all distributed generation can be attributed to solar PV panels installed on rooftops or small businesses. This installed capacity has greatly increased from 3 kW in 2007 to 247.6 MW by the end of 2016. According to the Mexican Ministry of Energy (SENER) if this trend continues till 2018 the total installed capacity will surpass 527 MW, this is the goal set by Mexico's Special Program for Energy Transition or PETE (Programa Especial de la Transición Energética)

Distributed energy in Mexico is classified as any system with a capacity below 500 kW. The National Association of Solar Energy (ANES from the Spanish acronym) reported approximately 21,600 interconnection permits for distributed solar in 2015. In March, 2017 the Energy Regulatory Commission (CRE) approved regulation that allows net metering for distributed energy generation.

== Solar potential ==
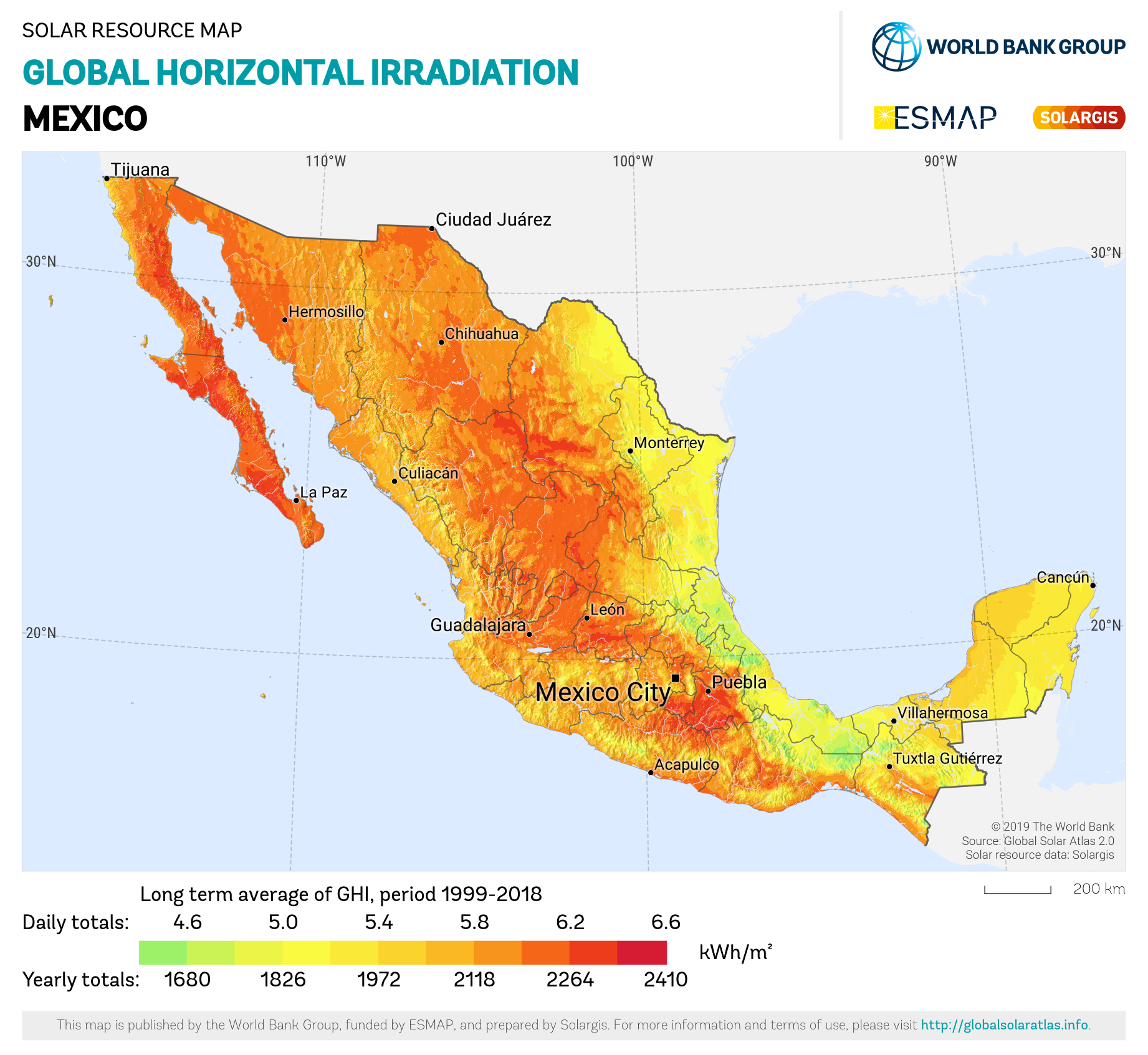
Solar irradiation map of Mexico

Source: WilsonCenter.org – Solar Energy Potential (PDF)

== Installed capacity ==
PV capacity in Mexico by year (MW)
Year	Total capacity	Installed capacity
2000	13.9	
2001	15.0	1.1
2002	16.2	1.2
2003	17.1	0.9
2004	18.2	1.1
2005	18.7	0.5
2006	19.7	1
2007	20.7	1
2008	21.7	1
2009	25.0	3.3
2010	30.6	5.6
2011	40.1	9.5
2012	52.4	12
2013	112	60
2014	176	64
2015	282	106
2016	320	38
2017	539	219
2018	3,017	2,478
2019	4,426	1,409
2020 (forecast)*	5,926	1,500

(*) This forecast does not account for economic impacts of the COVID-19 pandemic.

== See also ==
- Renewable energy in Mexico
- Wind power in Mexico
- Solar power
- Feed-in tariff
- Renewable energy
- Growth of photovoltaics
- Renewable energy by country
