= La Yesca Dam =

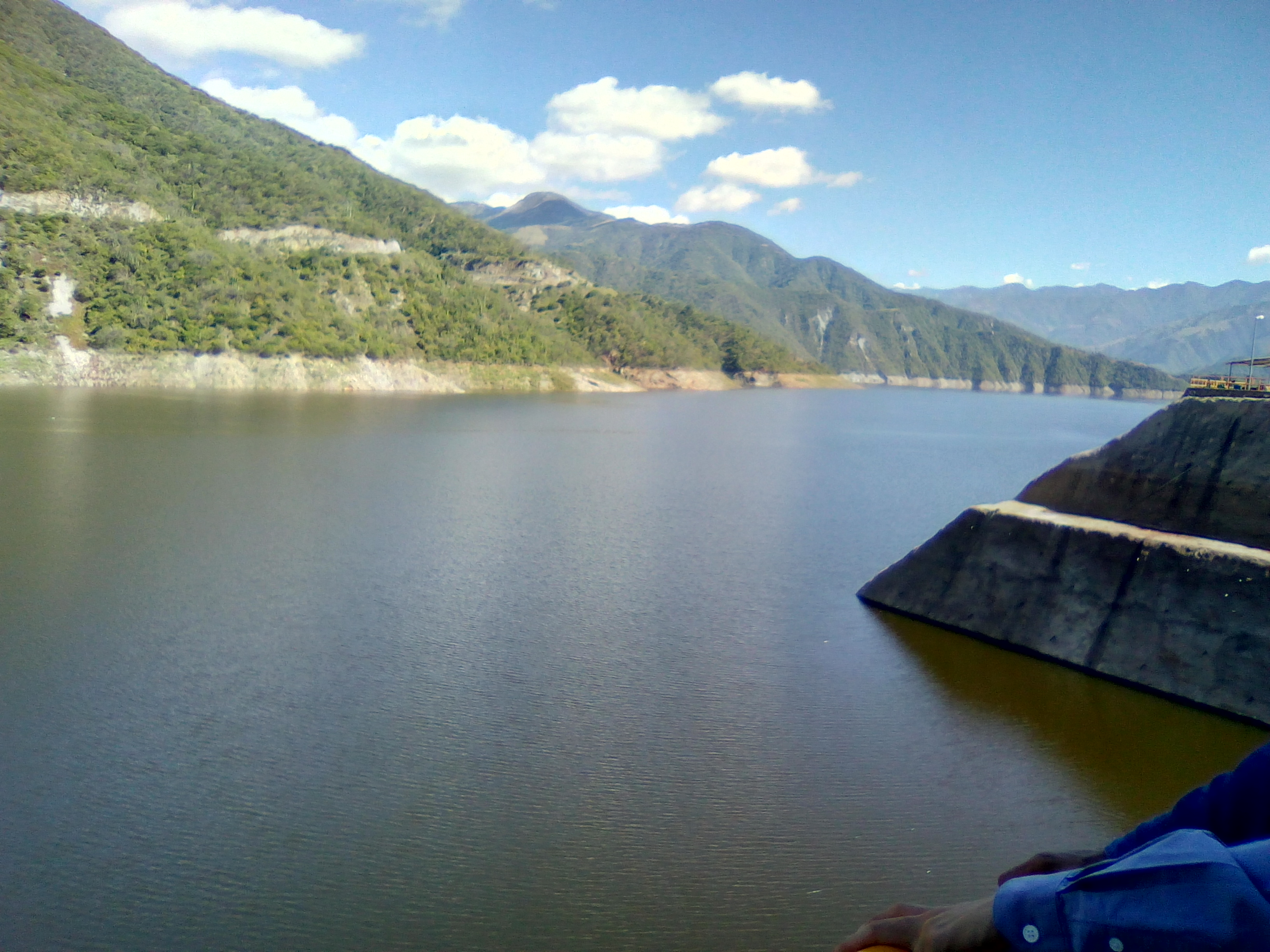

- Location within Mexico
- Official name: Presa Yesca
- Country: Mexico
- Location: La Yesca
- Coordinates: 21°11′50″N 104°05′44″W
- Purpose: Power, river regulation
- Status: Operational
- Construction began: 2007
- Opening date: 6 November 2012
- Construction cost: US$768 million
- Owner: Federal Electricity Commission

Dam and spillways
- Type of dam: Embankment, concrete-face rock-fill
- Impounds: Río Grande de Santiago
- Height: 220 m (722 ft)
- Length: 628 m (2,060 ft)
- Elevation at crest: 579 m (1,900 ft)
- Dam volume: 11,900,000 m^{3} (15,564,612 cu yd)
- Spillway type: Service, gate-controlled channel
- Spillway capacity: 15,915 m^{3}/s (562,033 cu ft/s)

Reservoir
- Total capacity: 2,500,000,000 m^{3} (2,026,783 acre⋅ft)
- Active capacity: 1,392,000,000 m^{3} (1,128,513 acre⋅ft)
- Catchment area: 51,590 km^{2} (19,919 sq mi)
- Surface area: 33.4 km^{2} (13 sq mi)
- Normal elevation: 575 m (1,886 ft)

Power Station
- Commission date: 2012
- Type: Conventional
- Turbines: 2 x 375 MW Francis-type
- Installed capacity: 750 MW
- Annual generation: 1,210 GWh (planned)

La Yesca Dam is an embankment dam on the Santiago River 90 km (56 mi) northwest of Guadalajara on the border of Mexico's Nayarit and Jalisco states. Construction on the dam began in 2007 after Empresas ICA was awarded the main construction contract. The dam was inaugurated by President Felipe Calderón on 6 November 2012. The dam supports a 750 MW hydroelectric power station and is part of the Hydroelectric System Santiago. Its construction will improve the regulation of water flow and subsequently power generation downstream at the El Cajón and Aguamilpa Dams.

== Design ==
The La Yesca Dam is a 220 m (722 ft) tall and 628 m (2,060 ft) long concrete-face rock-fill embankment type with 11,900,000 m^{3} (15,564,612 cu yd) of fill. The dam's crest elevation is 579 m (1,900 ft) above sea level and it sits at the head of a 51,590 km^{2} (19,919 sq mi) catchment area. On the dam's left bank is a spillway controlled by six radial gates. The maximum discharge of the spillway is 15,915 m^{3}/s (562,033 cu ft/s). The dam's reservoir has a capacity of 2,500,000,000 m^{3} (2,026,783 acre⋅ft) of which 1,392,000,000 m^{3} (1,128,513 acre⋅ft) can be used for generating electricity. The reservoir has a surface area of 33.4 km^{2} (13 sq mi) and a normal elevation of 575 m (1,886 ft). The power station contains two 375 MW Francis turbine generators producing an estimated annual generation of 1,210 GWh.

== See also ==
- List of power stations in Mexico
