= List of power stations in Mexico =

The following page lists power stations in Mexico. Mexico has 90,543 MW of energy capacity installed (December 2024). The installed generation capacity determines the maximum amount of electrical power that can be produced.

== Fossil fuel ==
Fuel oil	Community	Coordinates	Capacity (MW)
Villa de Reyes Power Plant	San Luis Potosi		700
Lerdo Durango Power Station	Sonora		320
Mazatlan Power Station	Sinaloa		1400
Puerto Libertad Power Station	Sonora		632

Coal	Community	Coordinates	Capacity (MW)
Carbon I Power Station	Coahuila		1200
Carbon II Power Station	Coahuila		1400
Petacalco Power Station	Guerrero		2768

Pet coke	Community	Coordinates	Capacity (MW)
Termoelectrica del Golfo Power Plant	Tamuin, San Luis Potosi	22°04′12.85″N 98°50′47.63″W	275
Termoelectrica Peñoles Power Plant	Tamuin, San Luis Potosi	22°04′11″N 98°50′50.95″W	275

== Geothermal ==
Geothermal	Community	Coordinates	Capacity (MW)
Cerro Prieto Geothermal Power Station	Mexicali, Baja California	32°24′43″N 115°14′41″W	720

== Hydroelectric ==
=== In service ===
Station	Community	Coordinates	Capacity (MW)
Aguamilpa Dam	Tepic, Nayarit	21°50′22″N 104°48′10″W	960
Ambrosio Figueroa (La Venta) Dam	La Venta, Guerrero		30
Ángel Albino Corzo (Peñitas) Dam	Ostuacán, Chiapas	17°26′46″N 97°27′30″W	420
Bacurato Dam	Sinaloa de Leyva, Sinaloa	25°52′5″N 107°53′48″W	92
Three gorges Dam	Tacámbaro, Michoacán		1
Belisario Domínguez (Angostura) Dam	Venustiano Carranza, Chiapas	16°24′06″N 92°46′43″W	900
Chinese Dam	San Francisco Conchos, Chihuahua		25
Botello Dam	Panindícuaro, Michoacán		13
Camilo Arriaga (El Salto) Dam	El Naranjo, San Luis Potosí		18
Carlos Ramírez Ulloa (El Caracol) Dam	Apaxtla, Guerrero	17°56′58″N 99°59′37″W	600
Chicoasén (Manuel Moreno) Dam	Chicoasén, Chiapas	16°56′30″N 93°06′02″W	2,430
Chilapan Dam	Catemaco, Veracruz		26
Cóbano Dam	Gabriel Zamora, Michoacán		52
Colimilla Dam	Tonalá, Jalisco		51
Colina Dam	San Francisco Conchos, Chihuahua		3
Colotlipa Dam	Quechultenango, Guerrero		8
Cupatitzio Dam	Uruapan, Michoacán	19°21′29″N 102°4′14″W	72
Electroquímica Dam	Cd. Valles, San Luis Potosí		1
Encanto Dam	Tlapacoyan, Veracruz		10
Falcón Dam	Nueva Cd. Guerrero, Tamaulipas	26°33′32″N 99°09′53″W	32
Fernando Hiriart Balderrama (Zimapán) Dam	Zimapán, Hidalgo	20°39′48″N 99°30′03″W	292
Humaya Dam	Badiraguato, Sinaloa	25°6′5″N 107°23′26.5″W	90
Infiernillo Dam	La Unión, Guerrero	18°16′23″N 101°53′34″W	1,120
Itzícuaro Dam	Peribán los Reyes, Michoacán		1
Ixtaczoquitlán Dam	Ixtaczoquitlán, Veracruz		2
José Cecilio del Valle Dam	Tapachula, Chiapas		21
Jumatán Dam	Tepic, Nayarit		2
La Amistad Dam	Acuña, Coahuila		66
La Yesca Dam	La Yesca, Nayarit/Jalisco	21°11′50″N 104°05′44″W	750
Leonardo Rodríguez Alcaine (El Cajón) Dam	Santa María del Oro, Nayarit	21°25′41″N 104°27′07″W	750
Luis Donaldo Colosio (Huitis) Dam	Choix, Sinaloa	26°50′41″N 108°22′8″W	422
Luis M. Rojas (Intermedia) Dam	Tonalá, Jalisco		5
Malpaso (Nezahualcoyotl) Dam	Tecpatán, Chiapas	17°10′43″N 93°35′54″W	1,080
Manuel M. Diéguez (Santa Rosa) Dam	Amatitlán, Jalisco		61
Mazatepec Dam	Tlatlauquitepec, Puebla		220
Micos Dam	Cd. Valles, San Luis Potosí		1
Mocúzari Dam	Álamos, Sonora		10
Oviáchic (Álvaro Obregón) Dam	Cajeme, Sonora	27°49′21″N 109°53′34″W	19
Platanal Dam	Jacona, Michoacán		9
Plutarco Elías Calles (El Novillo) Dam	Soyopa, Sonora		135
Portezuelos I Dam	Atlixco, Puebla		2
Portezuelos II Dam	Atlixco, Puebla		1
Puente Grande Dam	Tonalá, Jalisco		12
Raúl J. Marsal (Comedero) Dam	Cosalá, Sinaloa		15
(Sanalona) Dam	Culiacán, Sinaloa		14
San Pedro Porúas Dam	Villa Madero, Michoacán		3
Schpoiná Dam	Venustiano Carranza, Chiapas		2
Tamazulapan Dam	Tamazulapan, Oaxaca		2
Temascal Dam	San Miguel Soyaltepec, Oaxaca	18°13′59″N 96°24′45″W	354
Texolo Dam	Teocelo, Veracruz		2
Tirio Dam	Morelia, Michoacán		1
Tuxpango Dam	Ixtaczoquitlán, Veracruz		36
Valentín Gómez Farías (Agua Prieta) Dam	Zapopan, Jalisco		240
Villita Dam	Lázaro Cárdenas, Michoacán		300
Zumpimito Dam	Uruapan, Michoacán		6
27 de Septiembre (El Fuerte) Dam	El Fuerte, Sinaloa		36

=== Out of service ===
Station	Community	Coordinates
El Durazno (Sistema Hidroeléctrico Miguel Alemán) Dam	Valle de Bravo	
Nunun Keseki Dam	Zoteapan, Veracruz	
Ixtapantongo (Miguel Alemán) Dam	Valle de Bravo	
Las Rosas Dam	Cadereyta, Querétaro	
Santa Bárbara (Miguel Alemán) Dam	Santo Tomás de los Plátanos	
Tepazolco Dam	Xochitlán, Puebla	
Tingambato (Miguel Alemán) Dam	Otzoloapan	

== Nuclear ==
Station	Community	Coordinates	Capacity (MW)
Laguna Verde Nuclear Power Station		19°43′15″N 96°24′23″W	1620

== Wind ==
Station	Community	Coordinates	Capacity (MW)
Eurus Wind Farm			250

== See also ==
- Electricity in Mexico
- List of power stations in North America
- List of largest power stations in the world
- Power station
