= Leexa Fox =

Mexican drag performer

- Born: Axeel Díaz Gutierrez
- Occupations: Drag performer, Singer, TV personality
- Television: La Más Draga; Drag Race Mexico

Leexa Fox is the stage name of Axeel Díaz Gutierrez, a Mexican drag performer who competed on the fourth season of La Más Draga and won the second season of Drag Race México. She is from Mexicali.

== Career ==
Leexa Fox won the second season of Drag Race México. For the makeover challenge, she was partnered with her sister. The duo's outfits served as a message for the non-binary community.

On April 8th 2026, it was announced that they will be part of the cast of an upcoming TV Series based on the life of LGBT icon and Mexican celebrity Francis Garcia, portraying her during her youth.

== Personal life ==
Gutierrez is non-binary.

== Filmography ==
=== Television ===
| Year | Title | Role | Notes |
|---|---|---|---|
| 2024 | Drag Race México | Herself (contestant) | Season 2 (Winner) |

=== Web series ===
| Year | Title | Role | Notes |
|---|---|---|---|
| 2021 | La Más Draga | Herself (contestant) | Season 4; 5th place |

=== Music videos ===
| Year | Title | Artist | Producer |
|---|---|---|---|
| 2024 | Leexa Fox – La Llorona (Video Oficial) | Self | Manú Jalil |
| 2024 | Leexa Fox- Foxxyflow (Video oficial) | Self | Manú Jalil |
| 2024 | Leexa Fox – Tu Regalo (Video Oficial) | Self | Manú Jalil |
| 2026 | Entre El Humo (Video Oficial - Zomé x Leexa Fox | Zomé ft. Leexa Fox | TBA |
| 2026 | Kenia Os - Slay | Kenia Os | Sony Music Entertainment Mexico |

== Discography ==
=== Singles ===
| Year | Title | Album | Writer(s) | Producer(s) |
|---|---|---|---|---|
| 2021 | "Tu perdicion" | Non-Album/Single | N/A | N/A |
| 2024 | "La Llorona" | Non-Album/Single | N/A | Manú Jalil |
| 2024 | "Foxxyflow" | Non-Album/Single | N/A | Manú Jalil |
| 2024 | "Tu Regalo" | Non-Album/Single | N/A | Manú Jalil |

=== Studio Albums ===
| Release Date | Title | Label | Format |
|---|---|---|---|
| May 29, 2026 | Des-Nudos | Iván Rosa | Digital |

=== As featured artist ===
| Year | Title | Album | Writer(s) | Producer(s) |
|---|---|---|---|---|
| 2024 | "Lonely" (the cast of Drag Race Mexico season 2) | Non-Album/ Single | N/A | Omar Antonio Sosa Latourmerie |
| 2026 | "Entre El Humo" | Non-Album/Single | | |

== Awards and nominations ==
| Year | Award | Category | Work | Result | ref |
|---|---|---|---|---|---|
| 2025 | Impulse LGBTIQ+ Awads | Drag del Año | Herself | Winner | |

== See also ==
- List of people from Mexicali
