= Cerro Prieto Geothermal Power Station =

Geothermal energy complex in Baja California, Mexico

- Country: Mexico
- Location: South Mexicali, Baja California
- Coordinates: 32°24′43″N 115°14′41″W
- Status: Operational
- Commission date: 1973
- Operator: Comisión Federal de Electricidad

Power generation
- Units operational: CP1: 4 × 37.5MW, 1 × 30MW; CP2: 2 × 110MW; CP3: 2 × 110MW; CP4: 4 × 25MW; CP5: 2 × 50MW
- Nameplate capacity: 820 MW

The Cerro Prieto Geothermal Power Station is a complex of geothermal power stations in Baja California, Mexico. It is the world's largest complex of geothermal power stations in terms of overall size and the second-largest in terms of energy output, with an installed capacity of 820 MW. The facility is located just south of Mexicali and consists of five individual units, named CP1 through CP5.

== Stations ==
=== Cerro Prieto I ===
The CP1 powerhouse (32°24′43″N 115°14′41″W) has a total installed capacity of 180 MW, generated by four units of 37.5 MW and one unit of 30 MW. Units 1 and 2 of this powerhouse was commissioned between 1973, followed by 3 and 4 in 1981.

=== Cerro Prieto II ===
The CP2 powerhouse (32°23′27″N 115°13′33″W) has a total installed capacity of 220 MW, generated by two 110 MW units which were commissioned in 1982.

=== Cerro Prieto III ===
The CP3 powerhouse (32°23′52″N 115°14′18″W) has a total installed capacity of 220 MW, generated by two identical units as CP2, measuring 110 MW. This powerhouse was commissioned in 1983, a year after the commissioning of CP2.

=== Cerro Prieto IV ===
The CP4 station (32°24′15″N 115°12′43″W) commenced operations in July 2000, and consists of four turbines, each with a capacity of 25 MW.

=== Cerro Prieto V ===
The CP5 station (32°24′54″N 115°15′08″W) is the newest powerhouse of the Cerro Prieto station. It was proposed in July 2009, with the commencement of constructions in September 2009. CP5 will consist of two 50 MW units, increasing the total capacity of the Cerro Prieto Geothermal Power Station by 100 MW.

== See also ==
- List of power stations in Mexico
- List of geothermal power stations
- List of largest power stations in the world
