= List of people from Mexicali =

This is a list of people from Mexicali, Baja California.

== A ==
- Luis "Abuelo" Álvarez, Mexican archer
- Eduardo Auyón, painter

== B ==
- Norma Enriqueta Basilio de Sotelo, first female Olympic cauldron lighter
- Valente Bellozo, MLB pitcher for the Miami Marlins

== C ==
- Milton Castellanos Everardo, Governor of Baja California, 1971–1977
- Dino Cazares, musician, member of heavy metal band Fear Factory, former member of bands Asesino and Brujería
- David Cortés, MLB player for the Colorado Rockies

== D ==
- Nadir D'Priest, lead singer of 80s glam metal band London

== E ==
- Jorge Enríquez, mexican professional football player

== G ==
- Carlos Girón, silver medal winner in diving at the 1980 Olympics

== J ==
- Lupita Jones, Miss Mexico 1990, Miss Universe 1991

== L ==
- Denisse López, former Olympic gymnast
- Luis Alberto Lopez, IBF featherweight boxing champion
- Leexa Fox, Drag queen

== M ==
- José Madueña, mexican football player
- Alexa Moreno, former Olympic gymnast
- Los Muecas, mexican ballad group

== N ==
- Nikki Clan, pop-rock band

== P ==
- Azriel Páez, professional boxer, son of Jorge, brother of Jorge Jr.
- Jorge Páez, former professional boxer, world champion, actor
- Jorge Páez, Jr., professional boxer
- Tony Perezchica, former infielder for the San Francisco Giants and third base coach for the Arizona Diamondbacks

== R ==
- Miguel "Meegs" Rascon, musician, former member of Coal Chamber
- Reik, Latin Grammy-nominated pop group
- René Jaime Amaya Martínez, "Rorrito", television host and entertainer

== S ==
- Alan Slim, actor
- Daniel Sada, poet and writer
- Raúl Sandoval, actor and singer

== V ==
- Gus Vildósola, off-road racer
- Tavo Vildósola, off-road racer
- Manuel Vizcarra, Mexican judge, founder of Mexicali
- Vazquez Sounds, musical trio formed by the Vazquez siblings

== Z ==
- Ysaias Zamudio, former professional boxer
