= Aguamilpa Dam =

- Location of Aguamilpa Dam within the State of Nayarit Location of Aguamilpa Dam within Mexico
- Official name: Presa Aguamilpa
- Country: Mexico
- Location: Tepic Municipality
- Coordinates: 21°50′22″N 104°48′10″W
- Purpose: Power
- Status: Operational
- Construction began: 1989
- Opening date: 1993
- Construction cost: USD967 million
- Owner: Federal Electricity Commission

Dam and spillways
- Type of dam: Embankment, concrete-face rock-fill
- Height: 187 m (614 ft)
- Length: 660 m (2,165 ft)
- Elevation at crest: 260 m (853 ft)
- Dam volume: 14,000,000 m^{3} (18,311,309 cu yd)

Reservoir
- Total capacity: 6,950,000,000 m^{3} (5,634,457 acre⋅ft)
- Catchment area: 73,800 km^{2} (28,494 sq mi)
- Surface area: 127 km^{2} (49 sq mi)

Power Station
- Commission date: 1994
- Type: Conventional
- Turbines: 3 x 320 MW Francis-type
- Installed capacity: 960 MW
- Annual generation: 2,131 GWh

The Aguamilpa Dam is an embankment dam on the Río Grande de Santiago in the Mexican state of Nayarit, 38 km (24 mi) northeast of Tepic. The primary purpose of the dam is hydroelectric power generation and it supplies a 960 MW power station with water. Construction on the dam began in 1989 and it was completed in 1993 while the power station became operational in 1994.

== Background ==
Funding for the project was supplied by the Mexican Government, World Bank and USD250 million was invested by several foreign governments. A USD460 million World Bank loan was approved on 8 June 1989 and covered the Hydroelectric Development Project in Mexico which included the Aguamilpa Dam and the Zimapán Dam. Also included in the Aguamilpa Dam project was the power plant, substations and San Rafael Dam downstream. The dam was constructed by a consortium of engineering companies which included Hydroenergo, Siemens, Voest, ANDRITZ and Technit. In 1993, construction on the dam was complete and its power plant was operational August of the next year. The dam was inaugurated on 21 July 1993 and its total cost was USA$967 million. Approximately 3,000 people were displaced and resettled by the construction of both dams in the Mexico Hydroelectric Development Project.

== Design ==
The Aguamilpa Dam is a 187 m (614 ft) tall and 660 m (2,165 ft) long concrete-face rock-fill dam containing 14,000,000 m^{3} (18,311,309 cu yd) of fill. The dam sits at the head of a 73,800 km^{2} (28,494 sq mi) catchment area and creates a reservoir with a 127 km^{2} (49 sq mi) surface area and a capacity of 6,950,000,000 m^{3} (5,634,457 acre⋅ft). Controlling the dam's spillway are six 19 m (62 ft) high and 12 m (39 ft) wide radial gates and water is released into the power station's penstocks via three roller gates. The power station contains three 320 MW Francis turbine-generators for a total installed capacity of 960 MW. Downstream of the Aguamilpa Dam is the San Rafael Dam at 21°46′49″N 104°53′15″W which has a storage capacity of 54,000,000 m^{3} (43,779 acre⋅ft) and serves as a regulatory dam to control releases from Aguamilpa. A second phase of the project has yet to be built which includes the installation of two more 320 MW generators.

== See also ==
- List of power stations in Mexico
