= Autonomous University of Baja California, Mexicali =

Public research university in Mexicali, Baja California

Coordinates: 32.632199°N 115.444435°W

Autonomous University of Baja California, Campus Mexicali
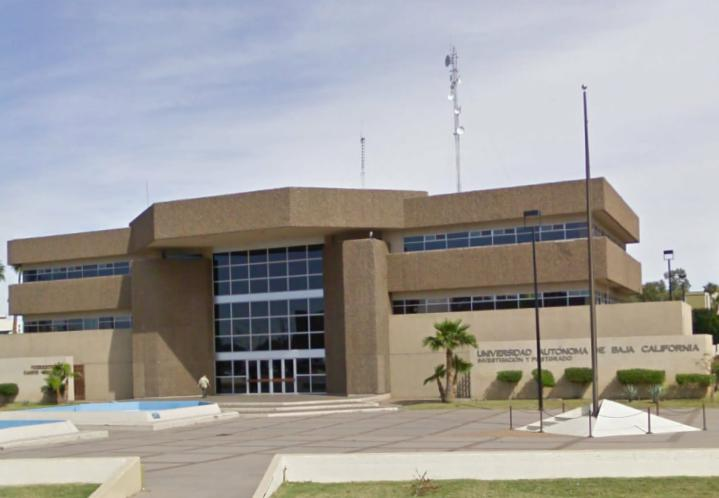
- UABC, Mexicali
- Established: February 28, 1957
- Website: http://www.uabc.mx/

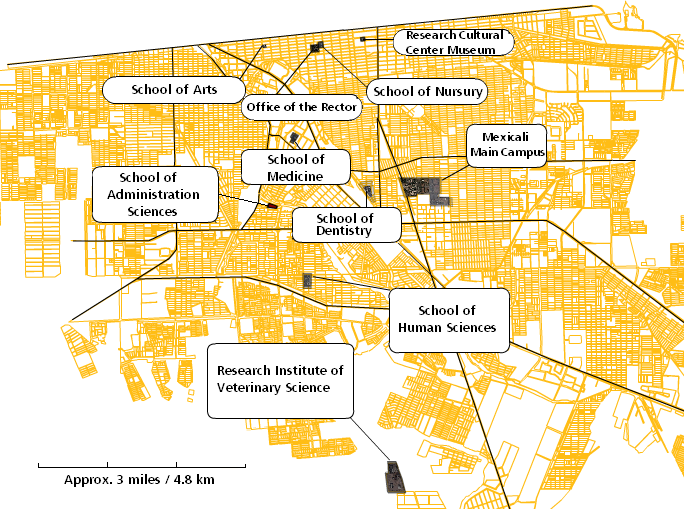
This map shows the physical locations of all ten UABC facilities in Mexicali, including the main campus, the Office of the Rectory, and its Schools around the city.

The Autonomous University of Baja California, Campus Mexicali is a public research university located on several campuses in the metropolitan area of Mexicali, Baja California. It is a branch of the Autonomous University of Baja California.

The Autonomous University of Baja California maintains three Units of Basic Formation in San Felipe, Ciudad Morelos, and Guadalupe Victoria. Campus Mexicali, which includes the Office of the Rectory, is the main and oldest of the 3 UABC campuses.
