= Laguna Verde Nuclear Power Station =

Nuclear generating station in Veracruz, Mexico

Laguna Verde Nuclear Power Plant
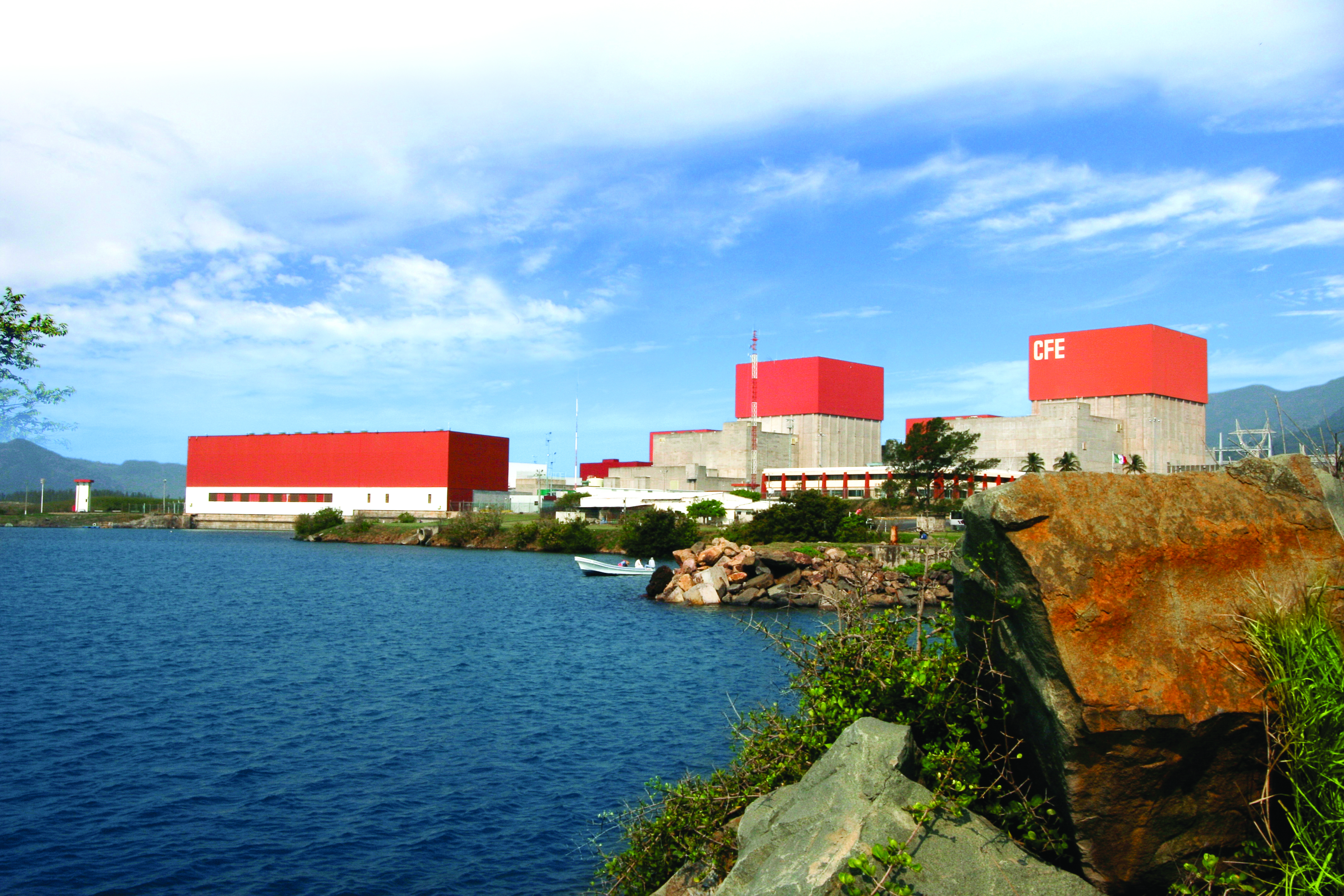
- Country: Mexico
- Location: Alto Lucero, Veracruz
- Coordinates: 19°43′15″N 96°24′23″W
- Status: Operational
- Commission date: 1990 (Unit 1); 1995 (Unit 2)
- Owner: Mexican government
- Operator: Comisión Federal de Electricidad (CFE)

Nuclear power station
- Reactor type: BWR
- Reactor supplier: General Electric
- Cooling source: Gulf of Mexico
- Thermal capacity: Units 1–2: 2 × 2317 MW_{th}

Power generation
- Units operational: 1 × 777 MW_{e} 1 × 775 MW_{e}
- Make and model: Unit 1–2: 2 × GE BWR-5
- Nameplate capacity: 1552 MW_{e}
- Capacity factor: 87.9% (2024)
- Annual net output: 11,978 GWh (2024)

External links
- Commons: Related media on Commons

The Laguna Verde Nuclear Power Plant (LVNPP) is a two-unit nuclear power plant located on the coast of the Gulf of Mexico, in Alto Lucero, Veracruz, Mexico. As of 2025, it is the only nuclear power plant in Mexico and produces 4.8% of the country's electricity. The plant is owned and operated by Comisión Federal de Electricidad (CFE), the national electric company administered with and for public resources.

== Description ==
The plant's two reactors are General Electric boiling water reactors (BWR-5). Unit 1 began operation on July 25, 1990, while Unit 2 began operating on April 9, 1995. Initial architects for the plant were Burns and Roe Inc, and later Ebasco Services designed and supervised the project. The steam turbine and other components were manufactured by Mitsubishi Electric.

Laguna Verde has been considered a strategic facility for the National Power System (SEN) due to its high power generation capacity, lowest operating cost, and frequency and voltage regulation capacity. All the electric power generated is delivered to its single client, the National Energy Control Center (CENACE). CENACE is entrusted with planning, directing, and supervising the transmission and distribution of electric power to end users. CENACE has classified LVNPP as Base Load Power Plant since the beginning of its operations. The annual generation average for LVNPP starting 2005 to 2010 has been 10.5 TWh, electric energy sufficient to meet the demand of more than 4 million inhabitants.

In 2020, the Ministry of Energy authorized the operating license extension of Unit 1 for an additional 30 years, to a 60-year lifetime until 2050.

== Power Uprate ==
In 2007, CFE signed a contract with an investment of US$600 million to increase the original capacity of each of the units of Laguna Verde by 20%, equivalent to 255 MW, in order to meet the growing electricity demand in Mexico. This power uprate will allow to LVNPP an additional annual generation of 2.1 TWh, equivalent to the demand of a city of 800,000 inhabitants.

GE and CFE jointly performed the engineering analysis to determine the necessary plant modifications and to support the safety analysis report necessary for approval of the power uprate by the national nuclear regulator, the Comisión Nacional de Seguridad Nuclear y Salvaguardias.

Work began in 2008 by Iberdrola and Alstom and finished in late 2010. The main modifications consist of a turbine and condenser retrofit and the replacement of the electric generator, main steam reheater and the feedwater heater. The budget for the project is US$605 million.

== Awards ==
Laguna Verde has obtained several awards. The plant received the National Quality Award (IFCT 2007), and Golden Award from Iberoamerican Foundation for Quality Management (FUNDIBEQ 2009).

In 2009, Laguna Verde obtained Annual recognition as a Socially Responsible Enterprise awarded by the Mexican Center for Philanthropy.

== See also ==
- List of nuclear power plants
- Boiling water reactor
- Nuclear power in Mexico
