= El Cajón Dam (Mexico) =

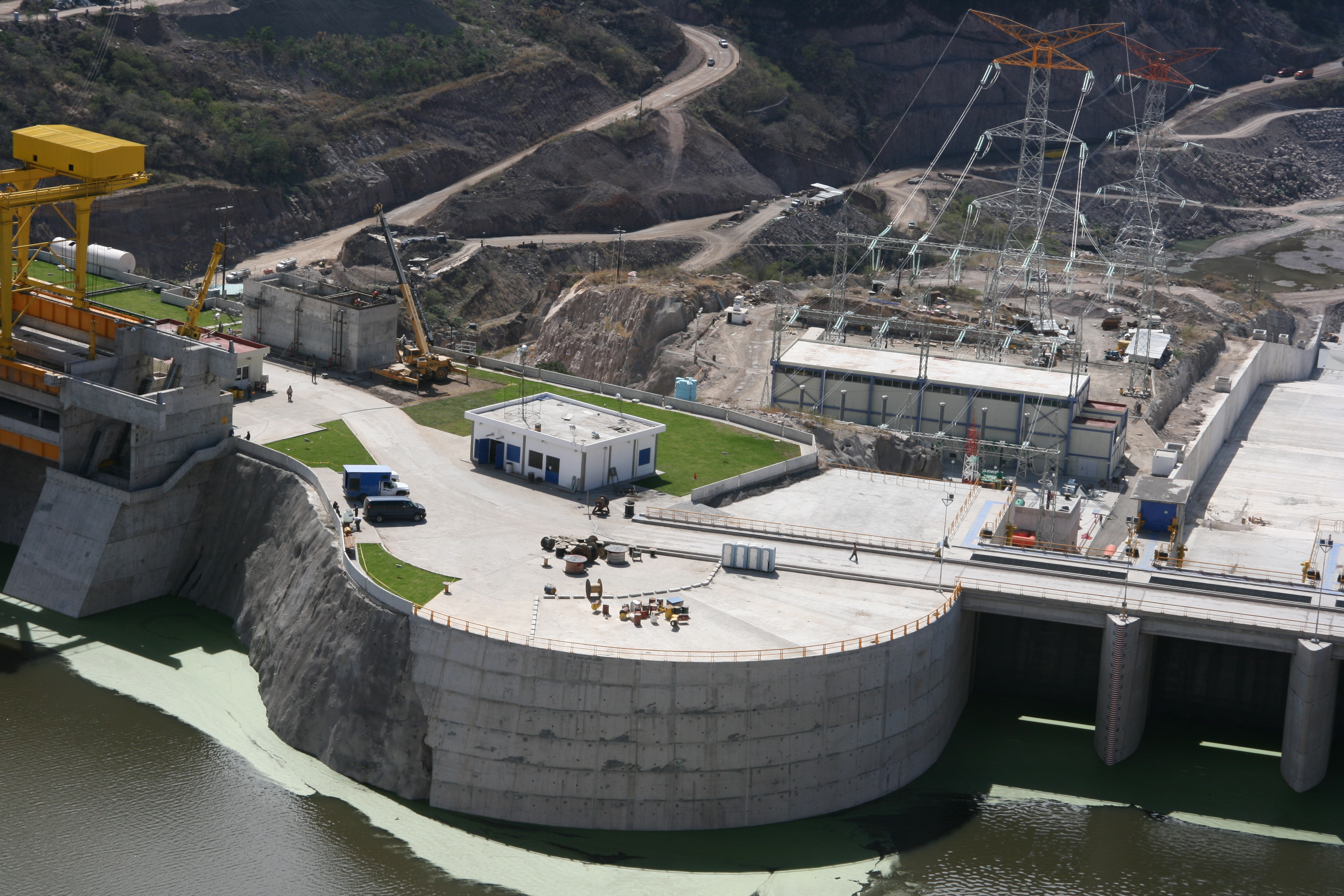
- View of upstream side of dam; concrete-face on left, spillway on right

- Location within Mexico
- Interactive map of El Cajón Dam
- Location: Nayarit, Mexico
- Coordinates: 21°25′41″N 104°27′07″W
- Purpose: Power
- Construction began: 2003
- Opening date: June 2007
- Construction cost: US$800 million

Dam and spillways
- Type of dam: Concrete-face rock-fill
- Impounds: Río Grande de Santiago
- Height: 178 m (584 ft)
- Length: 640 m (2,100 ft)
- Spillway type: Gate-controlled chute
- Spillway capacity: 14,864 m^{3}/s (524,917 cu ft/s)

Reservoir
- Creates: El Cajón Reservoir
- Total capacity: 5,000,000,000 m^{3} (4,100,000 acre⋅ft)

Power Station
- Operator: CFE
- Commission date: 2007
- Type: Conventional
- Turbines: 2 x 375 MW Francis-type
- Installed capacity: 750 MW
- Annual generation: 1,228 GWh

The El Cajón Dam is a hydroelectric dam on the Río Grande de Santiago in the Mexican state of Nayarit. Construction began in 2003 and was completed in June 2007. It cost US$800 million to build. It is 640 m (2,100 ft) long and is 178 m (584 ft) high. The reservoir holds approximately 5,000,000,000 m^{3} (1.8×10^{11} ft^{3}) of water, and the generators are capable of producing 750 MW of electricity. The dam is operated by the Comisión Federal de Electricidad, a state-owned Mexican electric company. Throughout the construction of the El Cajón Dam, the following is estimated:

- Rock fill with concrete face dam
- A cost of 800 million dollars
- An economic benefit of 2 billion pesos (160 million dollars)
- The creation of approximately 10,000 direct and indirect jobs
- The improvement of access roads that will benefit up to 20,000 inhabitants belonging to 40 communities
- An annual mean power generation of 1,228 GWh, approximately 1.5 times the annual consumption of Nayarit
- An installed capacity of 750 MW
- An approximate annual savings of two million barrels of fuel oil
- An increase in the firm power generation of the Aguamilpa Hydroelectric Station, due to the regulation of the Río Grande de Santiago and its effluents in the basin, as well as the diversification of the primary energy sources in the National Electric System.

== See also ==
- List of power stations in Mexico
