= Manuel Vizcarra =

Mexican politician

Manuel Vizcarra was a Mexican judge and founder of the city of Mexicali now the state capital of the state of Baja California (Mexico).

In 1901, Manuel Vizcarra was named Justice of the Peace for the town that would become Mexicali. The group of homes was part of the town of Los Algodones. In 1902, he was designated sub tax-collector for Ensenada and assistant judge of Mexicali sub-ordinate to the Justice of the Peace of Los Algodones. He did not accept the offer of assistant judge and on September 5, 1903, Benigno González took the position. However, March 14, 1903, the date Vizcarra was offered the position, is considered (since 1968) as the date Mexicali was founded.

In 1902, formed part of the commission organized to select names for Mexicali and the town across the border, Calexico, California as sheriff of Los Algodones. Vizcarra supported the proposal that the name had to be Mexicali in response to journalist Leroy Holt's proposal for Calexico for the neighboring town.
