= Mexicali =

Capital city of Baja California, Mexico

- City
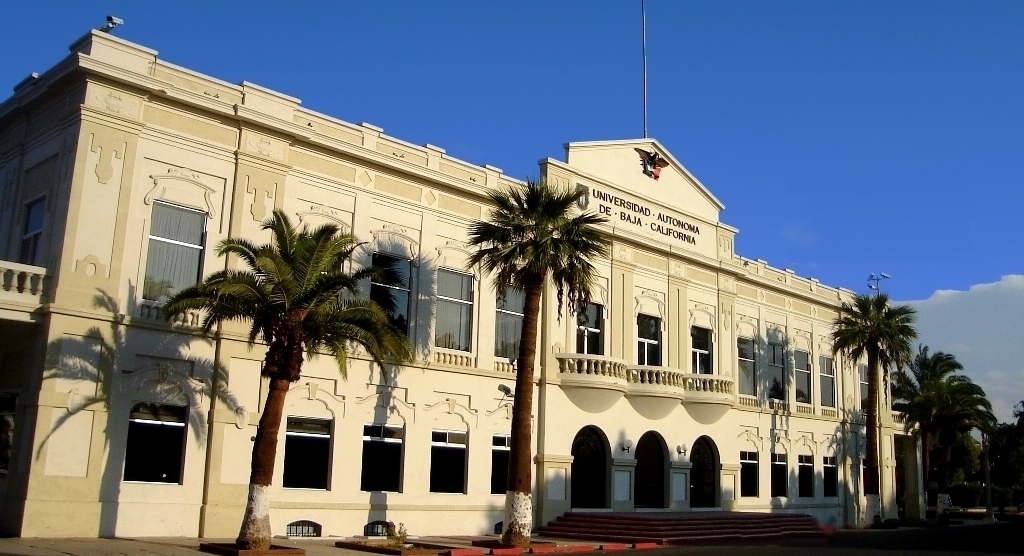
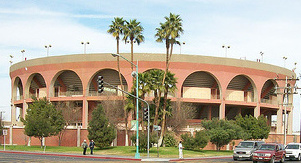
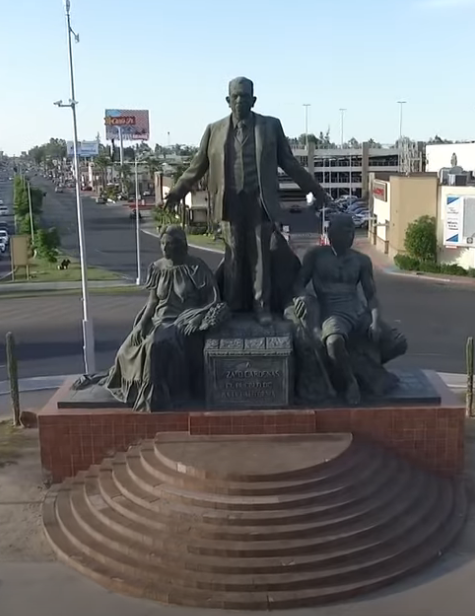
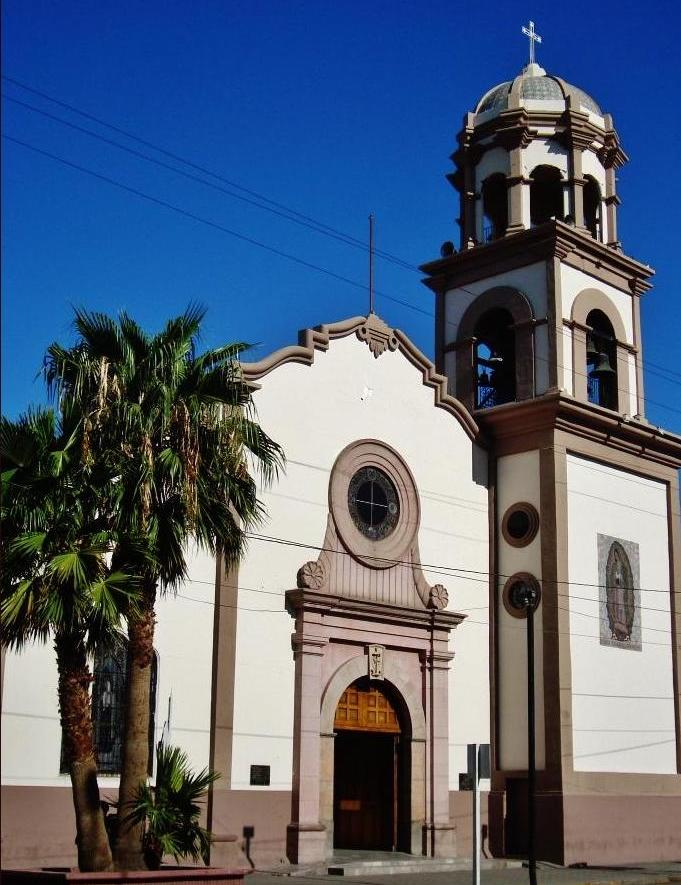
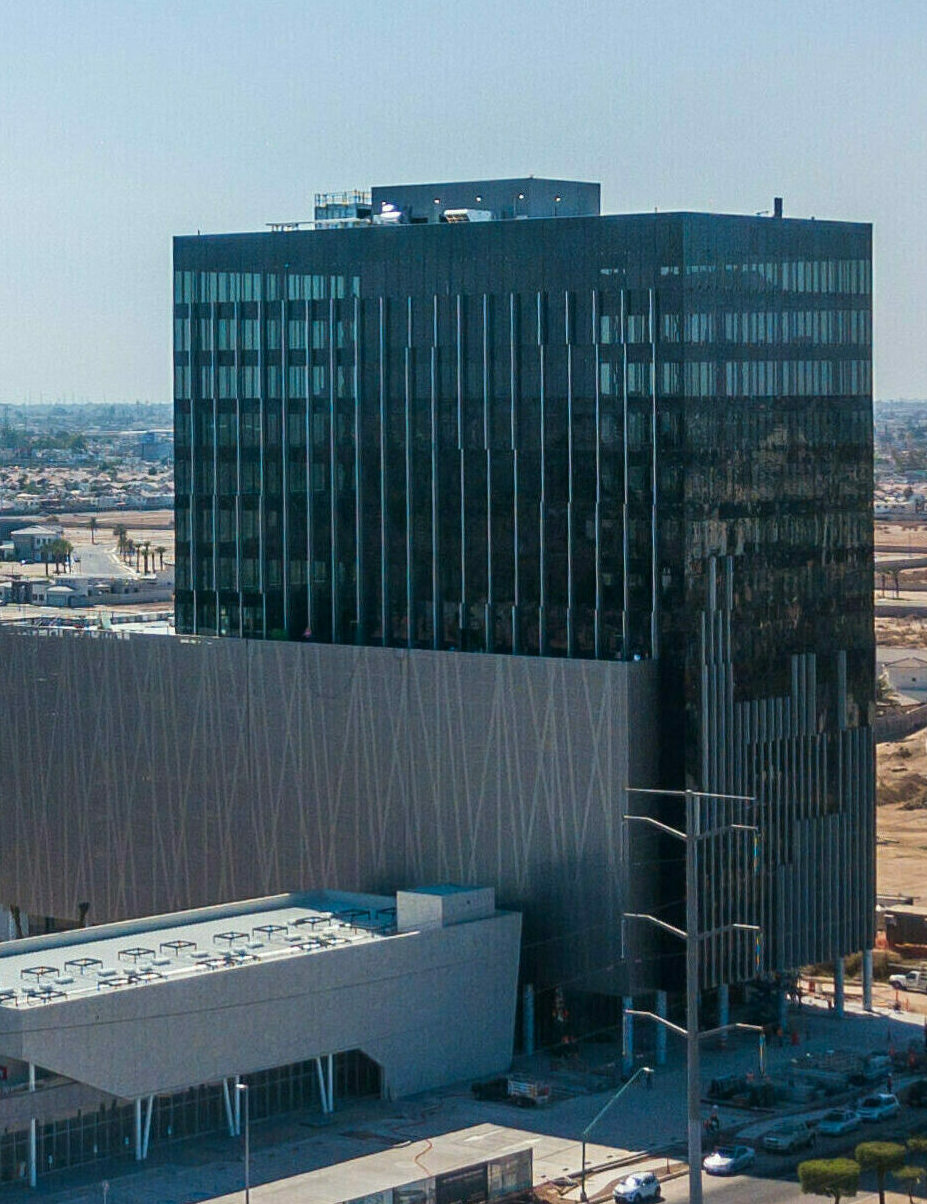
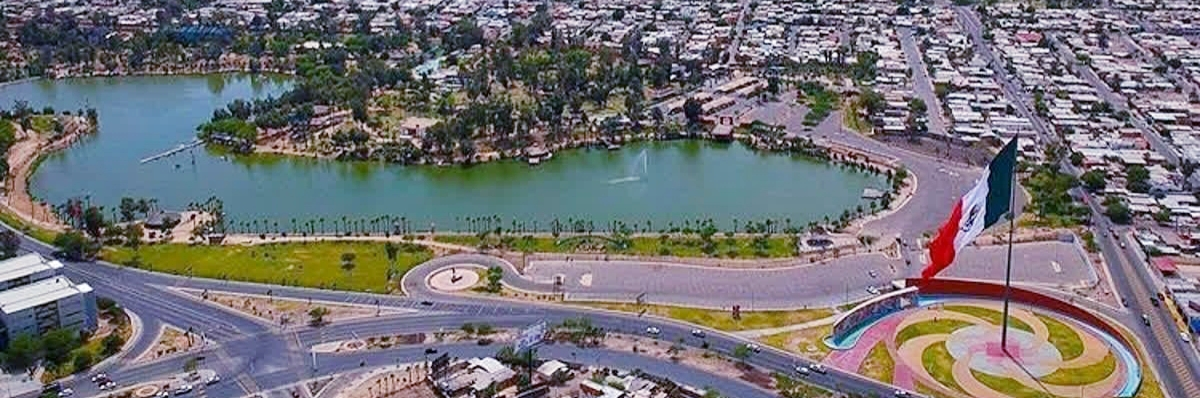
- Top: Autonomous University of Baja California, Mexicali (left), Plaza Calafia (right); middle: Lázaro Cárdenas Monument (left), Our Lady of Guadalupe Cathedral (center), Punta Este (right); bottom: Bosque de la Ciudad Park.

- Flag Coat of arms
- Nickname: The City that Captured the Sun
- Location within Baja California Location within Mexico Location within North America
- Coordinates: 32°39′48″N 115°28′04″W
- Country: Mexico
- State: Baja California
- Municipality: Mexicali
- Founded: March 14, 1903

Government
  - Type: Ayuntamiento
  - Municipal President: Norma Alicia Bustamante Martínez (MORENA)

Area
  - City: 113.7 km^{2} (43.9 sq mi)
- Elevation: 8 m (26 ft)

Population (2020)
  - City: 854,186
  - Density: 7,513/km^{2} (19,460/sq mi)
  - Urban: 862,360
  - Metro: 1,215,000
- Demonym(s): mexicalense, cachanilla

GDP (PPP, constant 2015 values)
  - Year: 2023
  - Total: $25.1 billion
  - Per capita: $21,300
- Time zone: UTC−08:00 (Zona Noroeste)
  - Summer (DST): UTC−07:00 (DST)
- Postal code: 21000-21399 (urban area)
- Area code: +52 686

Mexicali (English: /ˌmɛksɪˈkæli/; Spanish: [mexiˈkali]; Yue Chinese: 墨西加利) is the capital city of the Mexican state of Baja California. The city, which abuts the Mexico–United States border and the U.S. city of Calexico, California, is the seat of the Mexicali Municipality. It has a population of 689,775, according to the 2010 census, while the Calexico–Mexicali metropolitan area is home to a combined population of 1,000,000. Mexicali is a regional economic and cultural hub for the border region of The Californias.

Mexicali was founded at the turn of the 20th century, when the region's agricultural economy experienced a boom. The city rapidly expanded throughout the 20th century, owing to the proliferation of maquiladoras in the city, making the economy more interconnected with businesses from across the border. Today, Mexicali is a major manufacturing center and an emerging tourist destination.

== History ==
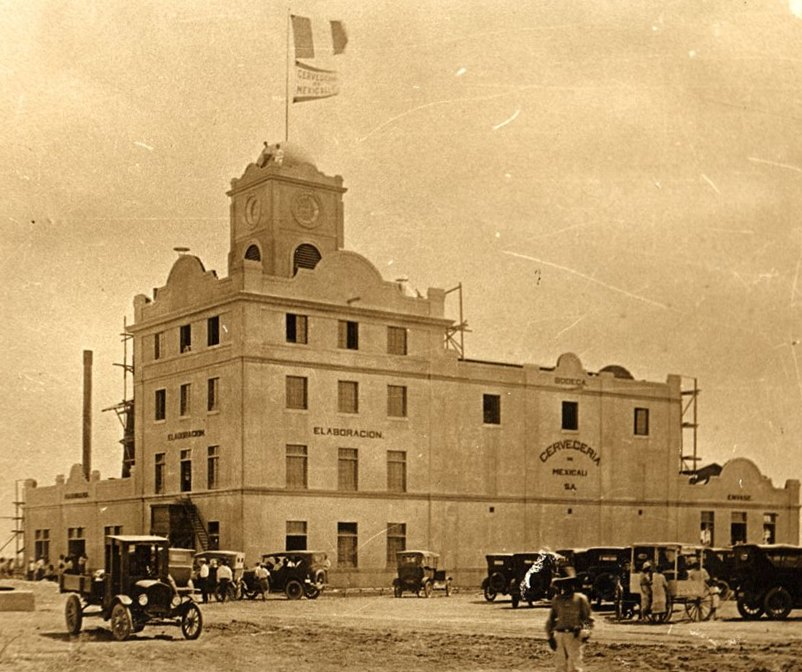
Cervecería Mexicali in the 1920s

The Spanish arrived in the area after crossing the Sonoran Desert's "Camino del Diablo" or Devil's Road. This led to the evangelization of the area by Catholic missionaries and also to the reduction of native populations in the region. Nowadays, indigenous Cocopah people still inhabit a small government-protected corner of the Colorado River delta near the junction of the Hardy and the Colorado. The Cocopah mostly work on agricultural ejidos or fishing.

The early European presence in this area was limited to Anza's and subsequent Spanish expeditions across the Colorado Desert and subsequent travelers on the Sonora Road opened by them. Also the presence of the Jesuits who attempted to establish a mission in what is now Fort Yuma. They left after a revolt by the Yuma in 1781. After this, the Spanish had little to do with the northeastern corner of the Baja California Peninsula, perceiving it as an untamable, flood-prone desert delta. Later in the 1820s, the Mexican authorities reopened the Sonoran Road and restored peaceful relations with the Yuma People.

=== 19th century ===
In the mid-19th century, a geologist working for the Southern Pacific Railroad came to the delta area, discovering what the native Yumans had known for centuries: that the thick river sediment deposits made the area prime farming land. These sediments extended far to the west of the river itself, accumulating in a shallow basin below the Sierra de Cucapá. However, from this time period until the 1880s, the area was almost completely unpopulated, mostly due to its harsh climate. In 1888, the federal government granted a large part of northern Baja California state, including Mexicali, to Guillermo Andrade, with the purpose of colonizing the area on the recently created border with the United States. However, around 1900, the only area with any real population, aside from the Cocopah, were concentrated in Los Algodones, to the east of Mexicali.

=== 20th century ===
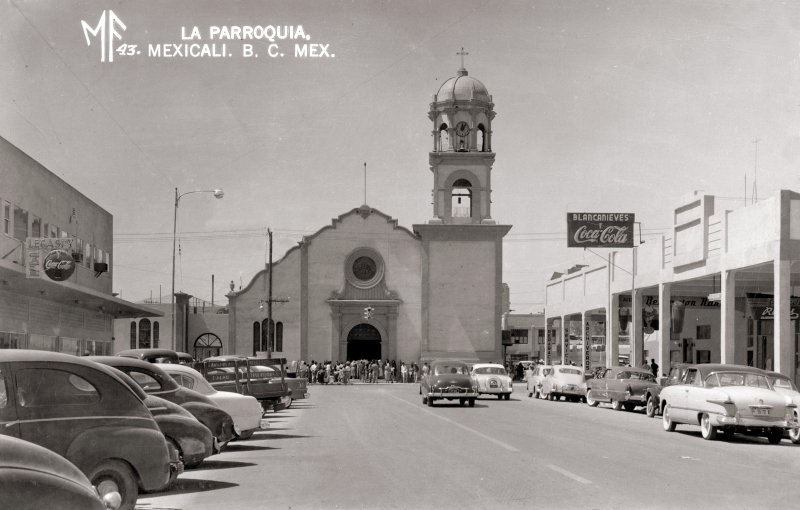
Downtown Mexicali in the 1940s

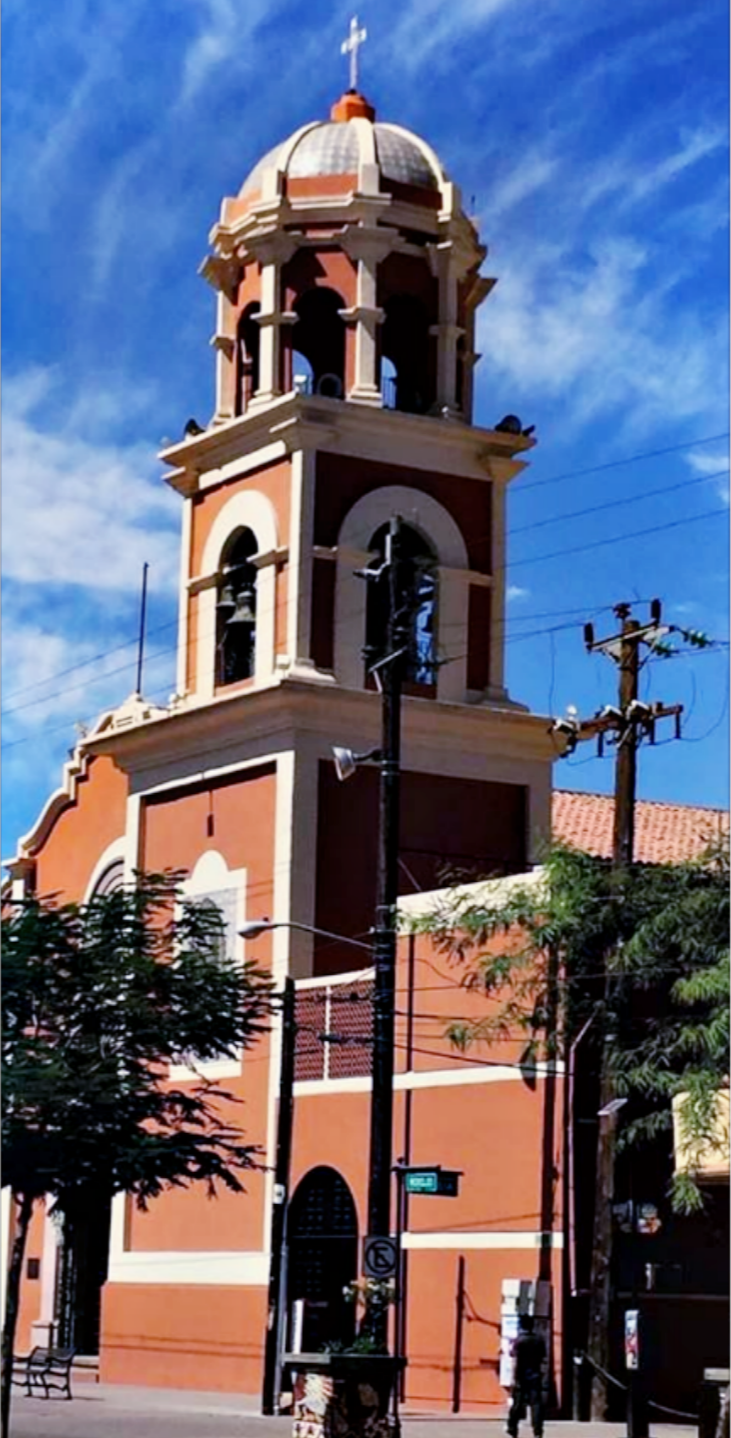
The Cathedral of Our Lady of Guadalupe began construction in 1918

In 1900, the U.S.-based California Development Company received permission from the government of Díaz to cut a canal through the delta's Arroyo Alamo, to link the dry basin with the Colorado River. To attract farmers to the area, the developers named it the "Imperial Valley". In 1903, the first 500 farmers arrived; by late 1904, 405 km^{2} (100,000 acres) of valley were irrigated, with 10,000 people settled on the land harvesting cotton, fruits, and vegetables. The concentration of small housing units that straddled the border was called Calexico on the U.S. side and Mexicali on the Mexican side. Led by Los Angeles Times publisher Harry Chandler, one company controlled 800,000 hectares of land in northern Baja California by 1905, and began to build the irrigation system for the Valley. However, instead of using Mexican labor to dig the ditches, Chandler brought in thousands of Chinese laborers. Mexicali became culturally Chinese influenced.

The Mexican side was named Mexicali (a portmanteau composed of "Mexico" and "California") by Coronel Agustín Sanguinéz. Initially the area belonged to the municipality of Ensenada. The town of Mexicali was officially created on 14 March 1903 when Manuel Vizcarra was named as the town's first authority and Assistant Judge (juez auxiliar). On January 29, 1911, Mexicali was briefly "liberated" by the Liberal Party of Mexico during the Mexican Revolution. Mayor Baltazar Aviléz declared the municipality of Mexicali on November 4, 1914, and called for elections to creation of the first ayuntamiento or municipality, which was then headed by Francisco L. Montejano.

In the 20th century, the Colorado Riverland Company, a U.S.-based company, was dedicated to renting Mexican land to farmers; however, these farmers were almost always foreigners, such as Chinese, East Indians and Japanese. Mexicans were employed only as seasonal laborers. This situation led to the agrarian conflict known as the "Asalto a las Tierras" (Assault on the Lands) in 1937. in which Mexican land was taken by Mexicans.

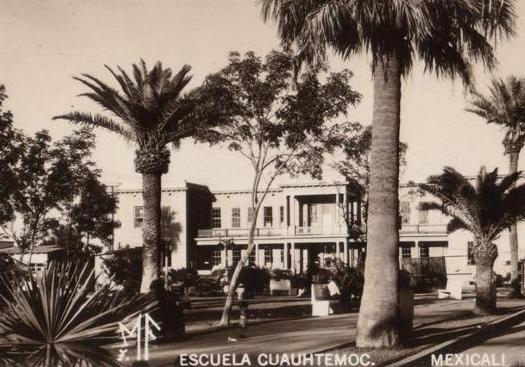
Cuauhtémoc School in the 1950s

Agricultural production continued to increase during the 20th century. Cotton became the most important crop and helped develop the textile industry. In the early 1950s, the Mexicali Valley became the biggest cotton-producing zone in the country and in the 1960s, production reached more than half a million parcels a year.

The first factories appeared in the 1960s with the end of the Bracero program. A 1988 study found 100 factories in the city, including 10 electronics manufacturers, 25 auto parts manufacturers, 27 textile plants and nine plastics companies. Most maquiladoras are run by US companies, followed by Mexican, South Korean, and Japanese companies.

=== 21st century ===
Today Mexicali is an important center for maquiladora (assembly plant) production in the automotive, aerospace, telecommunications, metallurgical, and health items as well as manufacturing and exporting products to various countries.

The 2010 Baja California earthquake occurred on Easter Sunday about 60 km (37 mi) south-southeast of Mexicali. This very large magnitude 7.2 earthquake occurred at 15:40:40 local time (UTC−8) according to the U.S. Geological Survey. With a maximum Mercalli intensity of VII (Very strong), it was felt in northern Baja California near the United States–Mexico border, and was also felt in western cities such as Tijuana, San Diego, Los Angeles and parts of Arizona.

== Geography ==
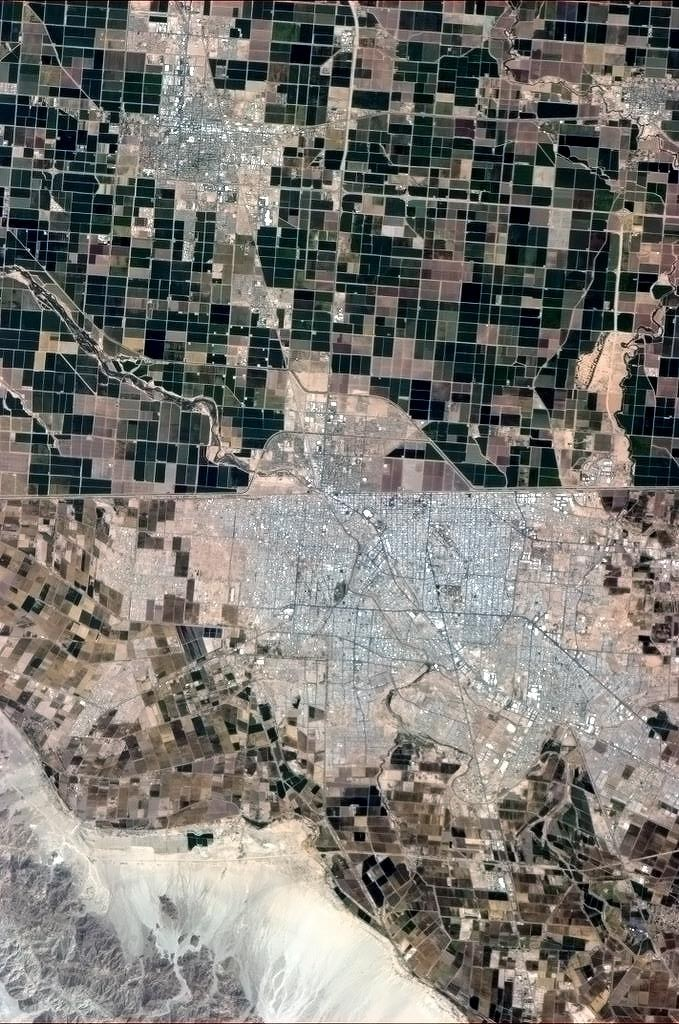
Satellite view of the Calexico-Mexicali metropolis, showing Mexicali and the surrounding Mexicali Valley on the bottom half and Calexico, California, and Imperial Valley on the top half.

The Mexicali Valley is one of the largest and most fertile valleys in Mexico. Over fifty different crops are grown in the valley, which is similar in production to the Imperial Valley. National and international industries have invested in Mexicali and surrounding cities to take advantage of its tax-free status given to industry. The Mexicali Valley is a primary source of water for the region, which is the largest irrigation district in Mexico.

A study by Instituto Mexicano de la Competitividad has listed Mexicali as Mexico's most polluted air of large cities, with a PM10 rating of 137 for the year 2010. It is thought that the reason is lack of pavement (dust) and lack of wind, especially in summer. The city is grappling with huge amounts of trash "from old appliances, to electronic waste and used tires, some of which comes from the United States." Mexican government agencies in the border region have not made pollution a priority, and weak enforcement of environmental standards is considered a reason that multinationals locate factories there, along with low wages. In general, maquiladoras are supposed to return any toxic waste to its country of origin, but in some cases it can be handled in Mexico.

=== Ecology ===
Despite its arid desert location, Mexicali is watered through a system of aquifers in the valley. Under a 1944 water treaty, the city is "guaranteed an annual quantity of 1,500,000 acre-feet (1.9 km^{3}) [of water] to be delivered" from the Colorado River. However, a proposed concrete lining in the United States on the All-American Canal would cut off billions of leaked gallons of water, which is used to irrigate onions, alfalfa, asparagus, squash and other crops in Mexicali.

The nearby Cerro Prieto volcano is adjacent to the Cerro Prieto Geothermal Power Station, which creates high volumes of pollutants including mercury. As of 2014, the government are creating a zone of exclusion, due to the alarming amount of pollutants and contamination that has permeated throughout miles around the geothermal plant of Cerro Prieto.

=== Climate ===
Because of its low annual precipitation, Mexicali has a hot arid climate (BWh), featuring long, extremely hot summers and mild to warm winters. Under the criteria for the Köppen climate classification, Mexicali maintains desert weather temperatures every year, receiving only 70.9 millimetres (2.79 in) of precipitation annually over 16 precipitation days on average. On December 12, 1932, the city experienced snowfall. Rainfall usually occurs in the winter months of December, January and February. Summer rainfall in the city is infrequent, although in some years thunderstorms and the remnants of tropical storms and hurricanes passing over Baja California from the Pacific can sometimes drop heavy rainfall (most likely in August and September). A notable example was Hurricane Kathleen in 1976, which dropped several inches of rain in the area. During winter time, Mexicali is affected by the snow storms that pass by the town of La Rumorosa located in the Sierra de Juárez, about 45 minutes west of the city, causing a decrease in temperature that lasts from two days to one week. July is the hottest month with a mean at 33.9 °C (93.0 °F) and an average high at 42.3 °C (108.1 °F), while January is the coolest month with a mean at 13.1 °C (55.6 °F) and an average low at 5.8 °C (42.4 °F).

On 28 July 1995, the Mexicali area recorded a temperature of 52.0 °C (125.6 °F).

Climate data for Mexicali (1991–2020)
Month	Jan	Feb	Mar	Apr	May	Jun	Jul	Aug	Sep	Oct	Nov	Dec	Year
Record high °C (°F)	30.2 (86.4)	33.5 (92.3)	39.5 (103.1)	42.5 (108.5)	47.0 (116.6)	51.4 (124.5)	52.4 (126.3)	51.4 (124.5)	49.6 (121.3)	47.4 (117.3)	36.0 (96.8)	30.5 (86.9)	52.4 (126.3)
Mean daily maximum °C (°F)	21.3 (70.3)	23.4 (74.1)	27.2 (81.0)	30.8 (87.4)	35.9 (96.6)	41.2 (106.2)	43.3 (109.9)	43.1 (109.6)	39.7 (103.5)	33.0 (91.4)	25.7 (78.3)	20.4 (68.7)	32.1 (89.8)
Daily mean °C (°F)	14.4 (57.9)	16.3 (61.3)	19.7 (67.5)	22.7 (72.9)	27.2 (81.0)	32.0 (89.6)	35.2 (95.4)	35.2 (95.4)	31.8 (89.2)	25.4 (77.7)	18.7 (65.7)	13.8 (56.8)	24.4 (75.9)
Mean daily minimum °C (°F)	7.5 (45.5)	9.2 (48.6)	12.1 (53.8)	14.6 (58.3)	18.5 (65.3)	22.8 (73.0)	27.1 (80.8)	27.3 (81.1)	23.9 (75.0)	17.8 (64.0)	11.6 (52.9)	7.2 (45.0)	16.6 (61.9)
Record low °C (°F)	−7.2 (19.0)	−4.0 (24.8)	−3.0 (26.6)	1.2 (34.2)	10.0 (50.0)	11.8 (53.2)	19.0 (66.2)	14.5 (58.1)	10.0 (50.0)	5.5 (41.9)	−4.8 (23.4)	−5.0 (23.0)	−7.2 (19.0)
Average precipitation mm (inches)	11.9 (0.47)	8.2 (0.32)	6.1 (0.24)	1.8 (0.07)	1.1 (0.04)	0.2 (0.01)	5.2 (0.20)	7.9 (0.31)	7.2 (0.28)	5.8 (0.23)	4.6 (0.18)	10.1 (0.40)	70.1 (2.76)
Average precipitation days (≥ 0.1 mm)	3.6	3.3	2.7	1.3	0.6	0.4	2.2	2.4	2.0	1.2	1.6	2.8	24.1
Source: Servicio Meteorologico Nacional

Climate data for Mexicali (1951–2010)
Month	Jan	Feb	Mar	Apr	May	Jun	Jul	Aug	Sep	Oct	Nov	Dec	Year
Record high °C (°F)	34.0 (93.2)	34.0 (93.2)	39.5 (103.1)	41.0 (105.8)	47.0 (116.6)	51.4 (124.5)	52.4 (126.3)	50.4 (122.7)	47.1 (116.8)	47.4 (117.3)	39.8 (103.6)	31.3 (88.3)	52.4 (126.3)
Mean daily maximum °C (°F)	20.5 (68.9)	23.0 (73.4)	26.0 (78.8)	29.7 (85.5)	35.0 (95.0)	40.0 (104.0)	42.3 (108.1)	41.5 (106.7)	38.7 (101.7)	32.5 (90.5)	25.3 (77.5)	20.4 (68.7)	31.2 (88.2)
Daily mean °C (°F)	13.1 (55.6)	15.3 (59.5)	18.0 (64.4)	21.3 (70.3)	25.8 (78.4)	30.5 (86.9)	33.9 (93.0)	33.5 (92.3)	30.4 (86.7)	24.3 (75.7)	17.5 (63.5)	13.1 (55.6)	23.1 (73.6)
Mean daily minimum °C (°F)	5.8 (42.4)	7.6 (45.7)	10.0 (50.0)	12.8 (55.0)	16.7 (62.1)	20.9 (69.6)	25.6 (78.1)	25.5 (77.9)	22.1 (71.8)	16.1 (61.0)	9.8 (49.6)	5.7 (42.3)	14.9 (58.8)
Record low °C (°F)	−7.0 (19.4)	−3.5 (25.7)	−0.9 (30.4)	0.0 (32.0)	6.0 (42.8)	9.1 (48.4)	13.5 (56.3)	14.5 (58.1)	8.0 (46.4)	0.3 (32.5)	−1.5 (29.3)	−8.0 (17.6)	−8.0 (17.6)
Average rainfall mm (inches)	10.6 (0.42)	7.2 (0.28)	5.8 (0.23)	1.6 (0.06)	0.5 (0.02)	0.2 (0.01)	3.8 (0.15)	10.1 (0.40)	7.5 (0.30)	8.4 (0.33)	4.9 (0.19)	10.3 (0.41)	70.9 (2.79)
Average rainy days (≥ 0.1 mm)	2.7	2.2	2.1	0.7	0.3	0.1	1.0	1.3	1.1	1.1	1.2	2.2	16.0
Source 1: Servicio Meteorológico Nacional
Source 2: El Sol de México, Servicio Meteorológico Nacional Twitter, and La Voz de la Frontera

== Demographics ==
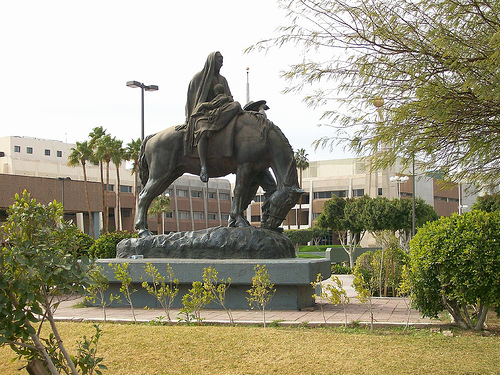
Monumento a los Pioneros

Historical population
Year	Pop.	±%
1910	462	—
1921	6,782	+1368.0%
1930	14,842	+118.8%
1940	18,775	+26.5%
1950	64,609	+244.1%
1960	174,540	+170.1%
1970	263,498	+51.0%
1980	341,559	+29.6%
1990	438,377	+28.3%
1995	505,016	+15.2%
2000	549,873	+8.9%
2005	653,046	+18.8%
2010	689,775	+5.6%
2020	854,186	+23.8%
INEGI: Archivo Histórico de localidades

As of 2020, the city of Mexicali had a population of 854,186.

The city itself had a 2005 census population of 653,046, whereas the municipality's population was 895,962. It is the 13th largest municipality in Mexico as of the Census 2005 with population estimates exceeding one million alone.

The population is constantly growing due to the number of maquiladoras in the area, lack of urban planning, and migrational aspects, like seasonal labor and the constant in-and-out flow of immigrants to the U.S. or into Mexico.

== Economy ==
Mexicali's economy has been historically based on agricultural products, and they remain a large sector of the economy. However, its economy has gradually gone from being agricultural to include industry, mainly maquiladoras—duty-free factories in which parts from the United States are imported, assembled, and then returned to the United States as finished products. Currently, the Mexicali Valley still is one of Mexico's most productive agricultural regions, mostly producing wheat, cotton and vegetables. The city is one of Mexico's most important exporters of asparagus, broccoli, carrots, green onions, lettuce, peas, peppers, radishes and tomatoes to the world.

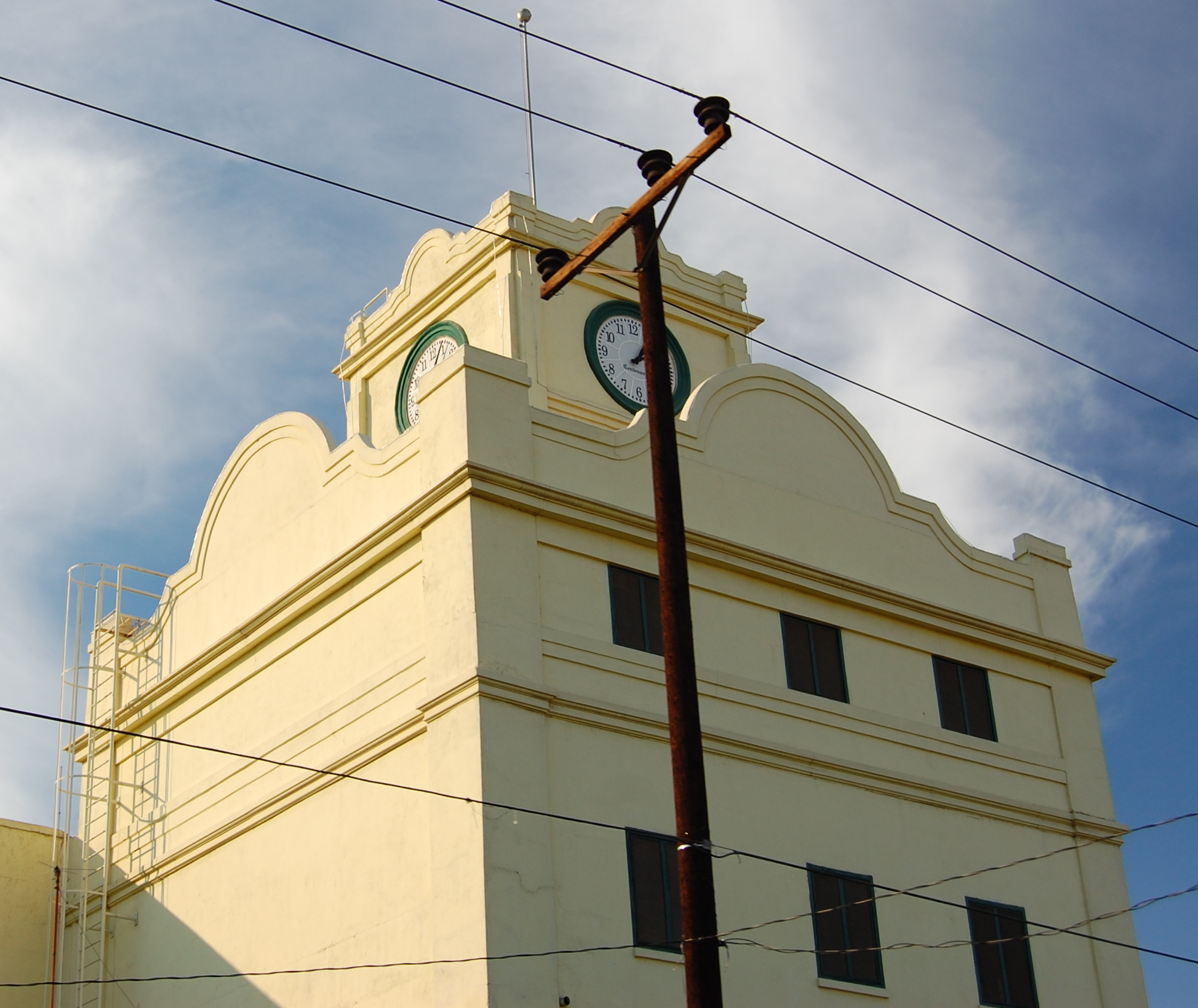
The historic Cervecería Mexicali

In its beginnings Mexicali was an important center for cotton production for export, until synthetic fabrics reduced the worldwide demand for the fiber. Currently, horticulture is the most successful agricultural activity with scallion (green onion), and asparagus being among the most important crops. Cotton and wheat are still grown, but low government price guarantees and subsidies make wheat farmer protests an annual event. There is an annual agri-business fair, which if unfunded by the government, would have been dead a decade ago, named AGROBAJA, Agrobaja in March of every year, drawing people by the thousands, from all over Mexico and before the crisis, from the United States.

The current prospects for economic growth in Mexicali rely on in-bond and assembly plants (maquiladoras), which come due to low wages and loose worker right laws, include companies like, Selther, Daewoo Electronics, Mitsubishi, Honeywell, Paccar, Vitro, Skyworks Solutions, CareFusion, Bosch, Price Pfister, Gulfstream, United Technologies Corporation, Kenworth, Kwikset and Collins Aerospace. Mexicali is also home to many food processing plants such as Nestlé, Jumex, Bimbo, Coca-Cola, Kellogg's, and Sabritas. In December 2018 there were 180 in all, employing 70,000 people.

Mexicali became the national center for the aerospace industry in Mexico when Rockwell Collins established an operation there in 1966. Rockwell Collins is the oldest company under the maquiladora program nationwide.

=== Silicon Border ===
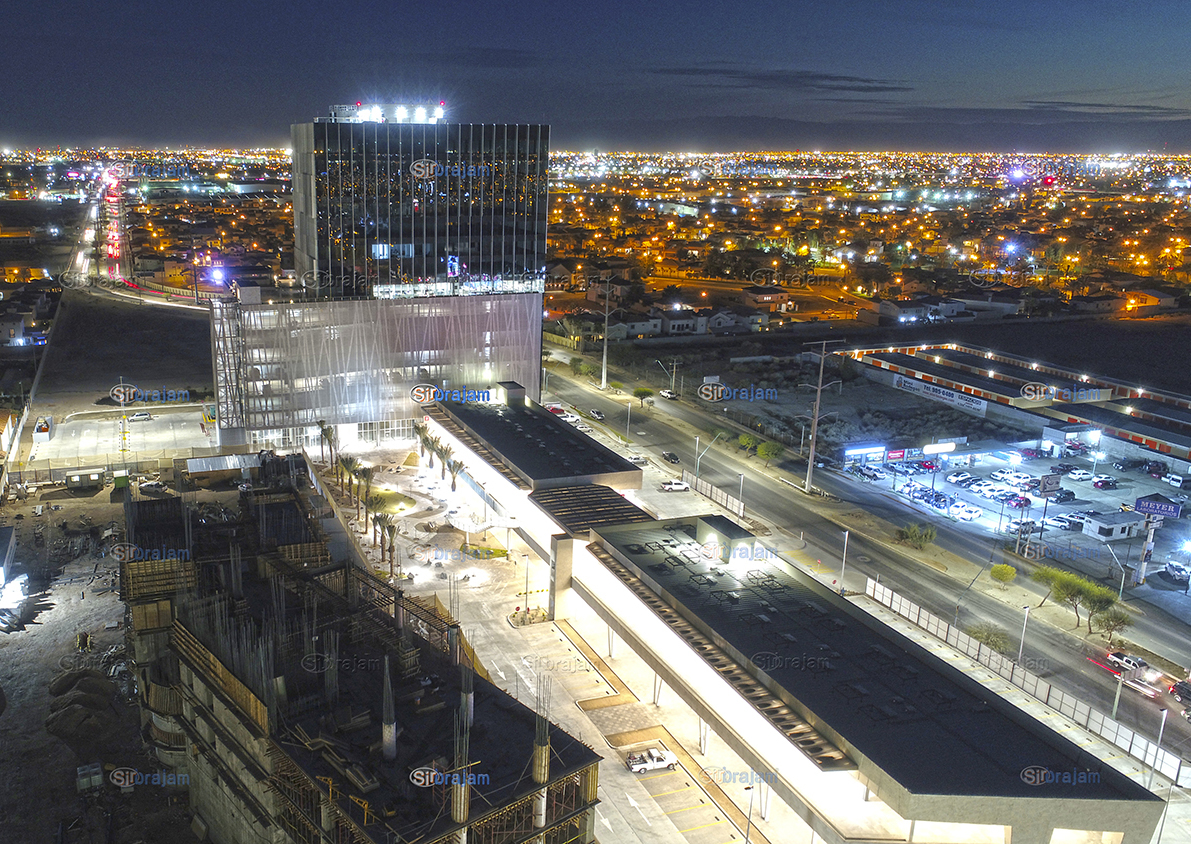
Development in Punta Este

Silicon Border is an empty 40-square-kilometer (9,900-acre) development supposedly tailored to the specific needs of high-technology manufacturing and is situated in the outskirts of Mexicali, along the western border of the U.S. and Mexico. The aim of the empty manufacturing park, which began in 2004, was to transform Mexicali into the world's next semiconductor manufacturing center. The Mexican federal and Baja California state governments have given away $2 million of public money to private hands without a referendum, with the laying of a few streets and lamp posts that can be seen on the premises as the only work done. Neither authorities nor the private frontmen of the project have given the public any account on what the public money was spent on. Former president Vicente Fox offered ten years of a tax rate as low as 3% to foreign-owned factories.

The premises sit empty as of October 2022.

=== Tourism ===
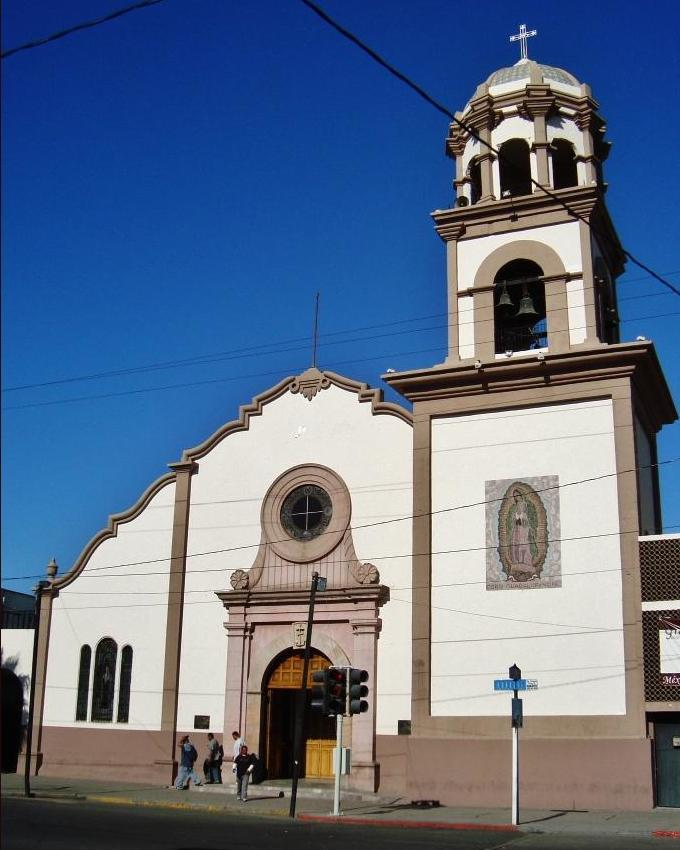
Cathedral of Our Lady of Guadalupe, seat of the Catholic Diocese of Mexicali

Mexicali also relies on tourism as a medium to generate revenue, and visitors cross by foot or by car from Calexico, United States, every day. Tourists are mainly attracted to local taco stands, restaurants, pharmacies, bars and dance clubs. Near the border, in walking distance, there are many shops and stalls selling Mexican curios and souvenirs. Arizona and Nevada residents look for medical and dental services in Mexicali, since they tend to be less expensive than in the United States. Pharmacies sell some drugs without a prescription and at much lower cost than in the US, but some medications still require a doctor's prescription, although several accessible doctor offices are located near the border as well.

Mexico's drinking age is 18 years old (versus 21 in the United States) which makes it a common weekend destination for many high school and college students from Southern California.

Mexicali hosts four main shopping malls, the most visited being Plaza La Cachanilla, located a mile away from the US border. The mall hosts a variety of shops, which sell a wide array of items, ranging from cheap Mexican curios to expensive imports. The Plaza La Cachanilla also represents a common place for people to socialize, especially during summer days when the weather reaches high temperatures, many families come and spend the day inside the air-conditioned mall.

For recreation, Mexicali has bath halls, bowling alleys, traditional cantinas, car clubs, strip clubs, movie theaters, museums, a zoo, a convention center, supermarkets, and fast food restaurants for every choice of food.

Galerias del Valle, holds a WalMart Supercenter, a twelve-screen Cinepolis movie theater, two casinos, a food court, and a large array of stores that sell many items needed for daily living. It is located on Boulevard Lázaro Cárdenas at Calle 11.

== Education ==
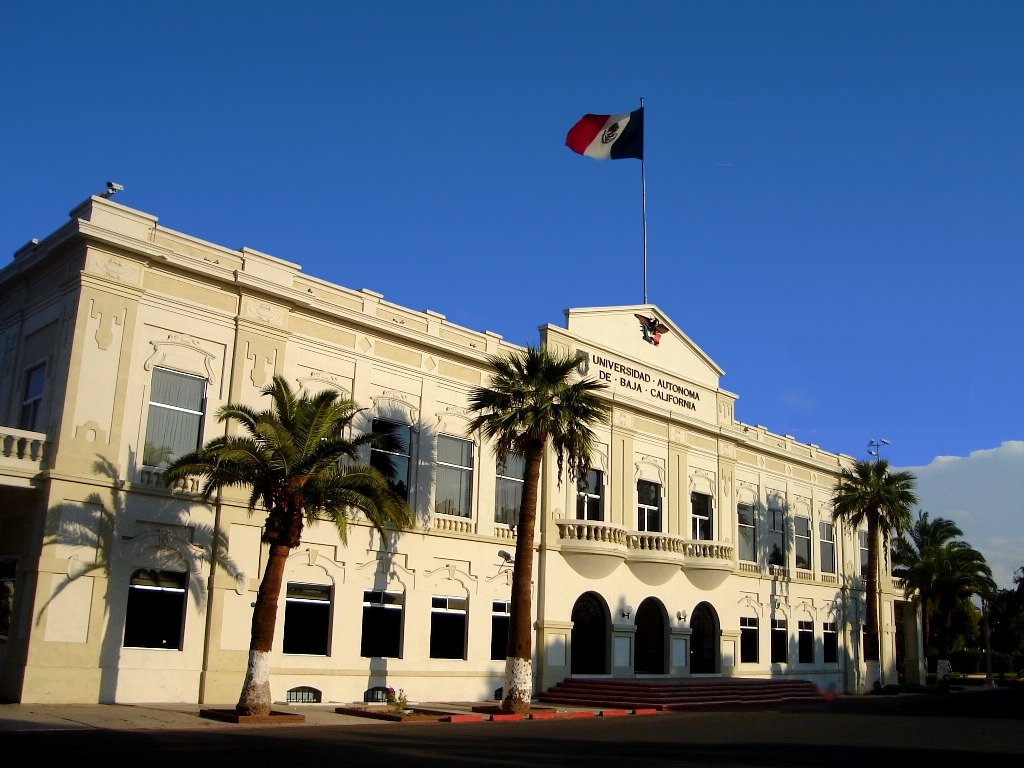
Campus of the Autonomous University of Baja California, Mexicali

According to a previous census conducted by the National Institute of Statistics and Geography (INEGI) in 2008, the number of students who have graduated from Mexicali's public and private schools are as follows:

Pre-scholar students: 18,648
Primary school students: 17,272
Secondary school students: 12,337
Technical education students: 531
Baccalaureate students: 6,152

Some public universities in the city include Autonomous University of Baja California, Mexicali, Universidad Politécnica de Baja California and the Mexicali Institute of Technology. Private universities include Centro de Enseñanza Técnica y Superior, University of the Valley of Mexico and Xochicalco University.

== Culture ==
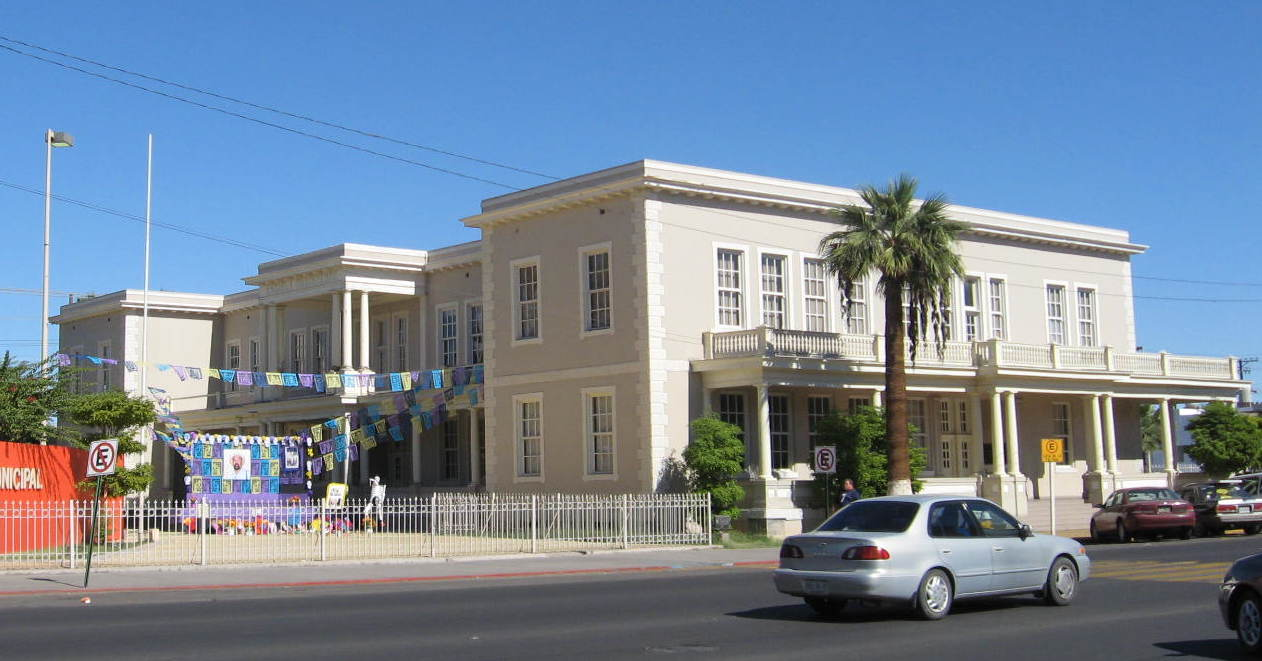
The Casa Cultural of Mexicali

The residents of Mexicali (Mexicalenses) call themselves "Cachanillas" (due to a local plant, the cachanilla, used by the Cucapah tribe to build shacks) and are from culturally diverse backgrounds. It is among the most ethnically diverse cities in Mexico, with people from various Native American, European, African, East Asian, and Middle Eastern origins.

There is a very popular song called "Puro Cachanilla" also known as "El Cachanilla" that identifies people from Mexicali. This song was originally recorded in 1963 by the ranchero singer Caín Corpus and written by the famous mexican composer Antonio Valdéz Herrera.

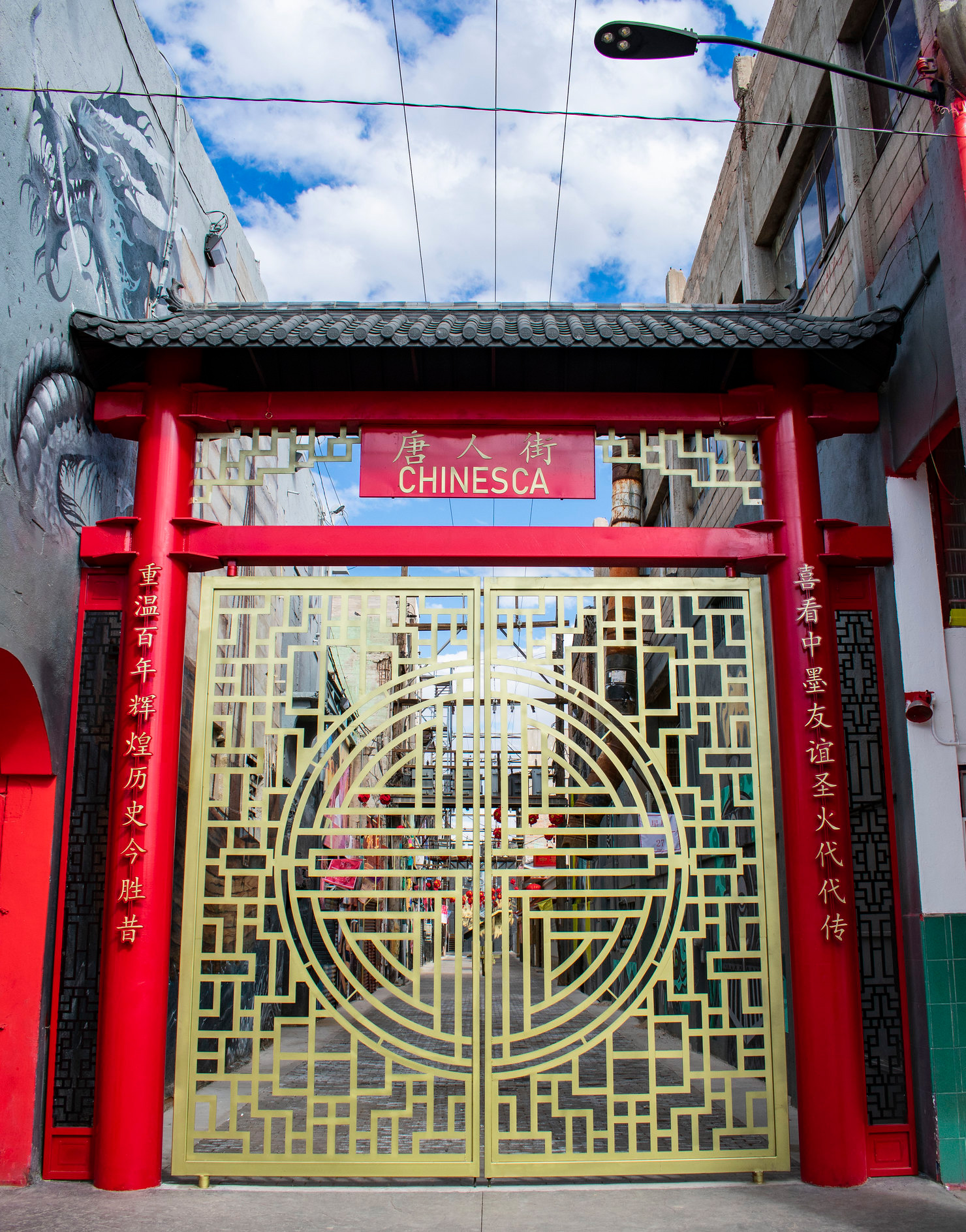
Ceremonial gate in La Chinesca

In 2004, there were 8 theaters in the city: Teatro del Estado, Teatro de Casa de Cultura de Mexicali. Idem, Teatro del CREA, Teatro Universitario de Mexicali, Teatro al Aire Libre de Rectoría, Teatro del Seguro Social, and Centro Estatal de las Artes.

Mexicali also has the Baja Prog festival, a series of progressive rock concerts that take place during four consecutive days in springtime. It is hosted by CAST, a progressive rock band from Mexicali.

=== La Chinesca ===
The city claimed to have the largest per capita concentration of residents of Chinese origin in Mexico, around 5,000 until 2012 when the Tijuana La Mesa District surpassed that number at 15,000 Chinese immigrants. The Chinese immigrants came to the area as laborers for the Colorado River Land Company, an American enterprise which designed and built an extensive irrigation system in the Valley of Mexicali. Some immigrants came from the United States, often fleeing anti-Chinese policies there, while others sailed directly from China. Thousands of Chinese were lured to the area by the promise of high wages, but that never materialized.

Since 2000, new migrants from China to Mexicali come from many of the same areas as before 1960, with perhaps 90% from Guangdong or Hong Kong.

== Sports ==
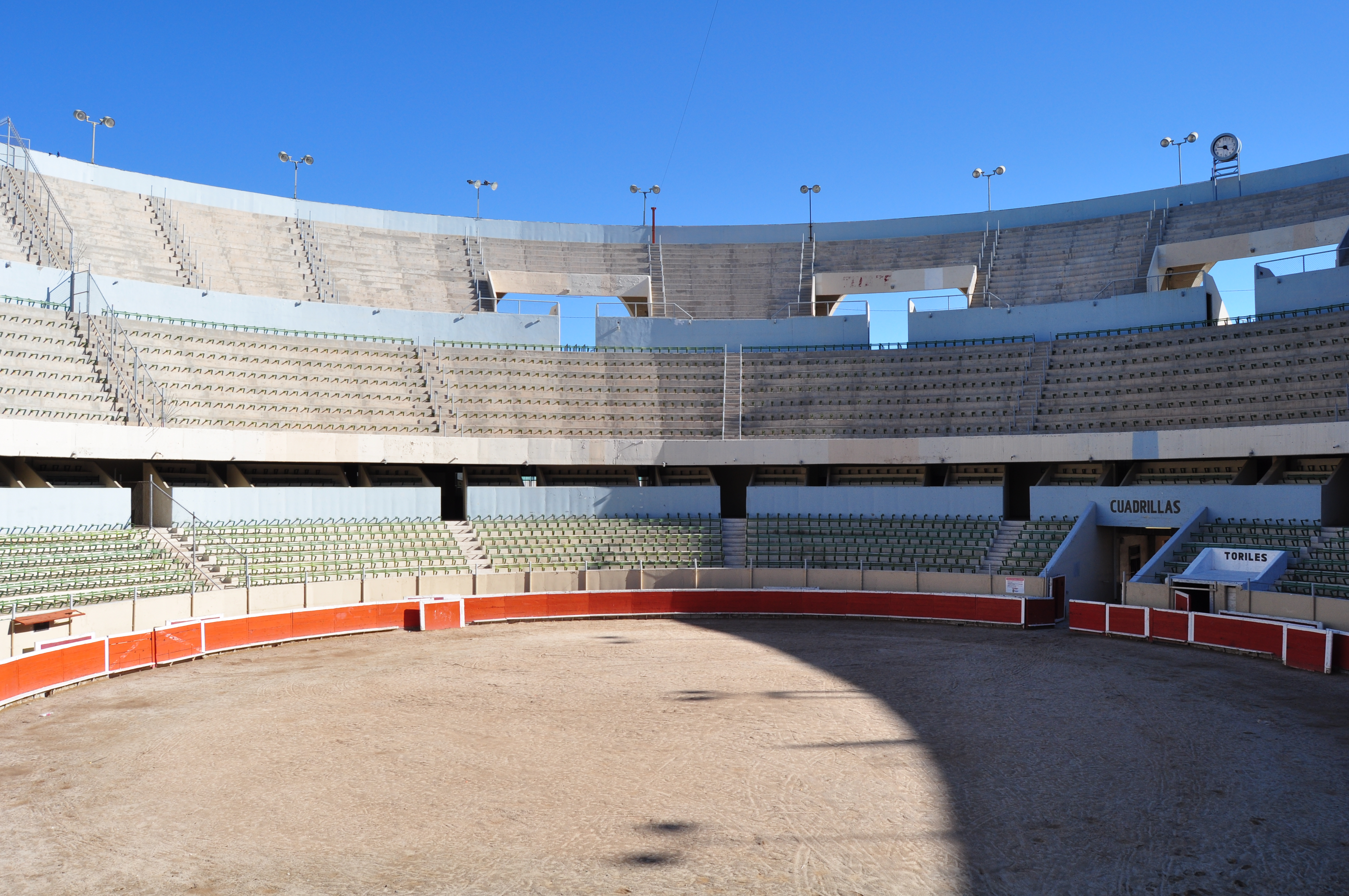
Plaza Calafia bullring, named after Queen Calafia, namesake of California

Mexicali has many sites visited by people from across Mexico, as well as by visitors from the U.S. and Canada, such as the bullfighting arena, Plaza Calafia, where one or two bullfights are held yearly. Mexicali also has a professional 18-hole golf course, Club Campestre, where both national and international championships have taken place.

The city's professional basketball team is Soles de Mexicali of the Liga Nacional de Baloncesto Profesional (LNBP). Soles lifted the national trophy as the 2006–07, 2014–15, 2017–18, and 2019–20 LNBP Champions. Their stadium, the Auditorio del Estado, is located in Ciudad Deportiva de Mexicali. The Bomberos de Mexicali were founded in 2010 and participated in the Pacific Coast Basketball Circuit, CIBACOPA. Another defunct franchise, Calor de Mexicali (Mexicali Heat), participated in the 2007 edition of the league. They played their home games at the Gimnasio de Mexicali located on Avenida Reforma. Mexicali was also home to a 2006 American Basketball Association franchise, the Centinelas de Mexicali (The Sentinels).

Ciudad Deportiva houses a football stadium where Mexicali Fútbol Club in the Mexican Second Division and Cachanillas de Mexicali, a Mexican Third Division team plays. The home of the Pioneros del Valle, also a Mexican third division football team, is located in the Mexicali Valley.

In addition, Ciudad Deportiva is the location of Farmacias Sta Maria formally known as Estadio B'Air, where the Águilas de Mexicali play, competing in winter baseball's Mexican Pacific League (LMP). The Centinelas de Mexicali are a professional team which plays in the North Sonora League, the main development league for the LMP. Young Mexicali baseball players have played in the Little League World Series five times; first in 1985, with the Félix Arce Little League representing the United States West region, and then in 2005, 2007, 2011 and 2015 the Seguro Social Little League representing Mexicali.

Mexicali is the host of the Baja 250, a desert race that begins the SCORE International season. The city previously hosted SCORE's Mexicali 300 and 250 from 1978 to 1981.

== Transportation ==
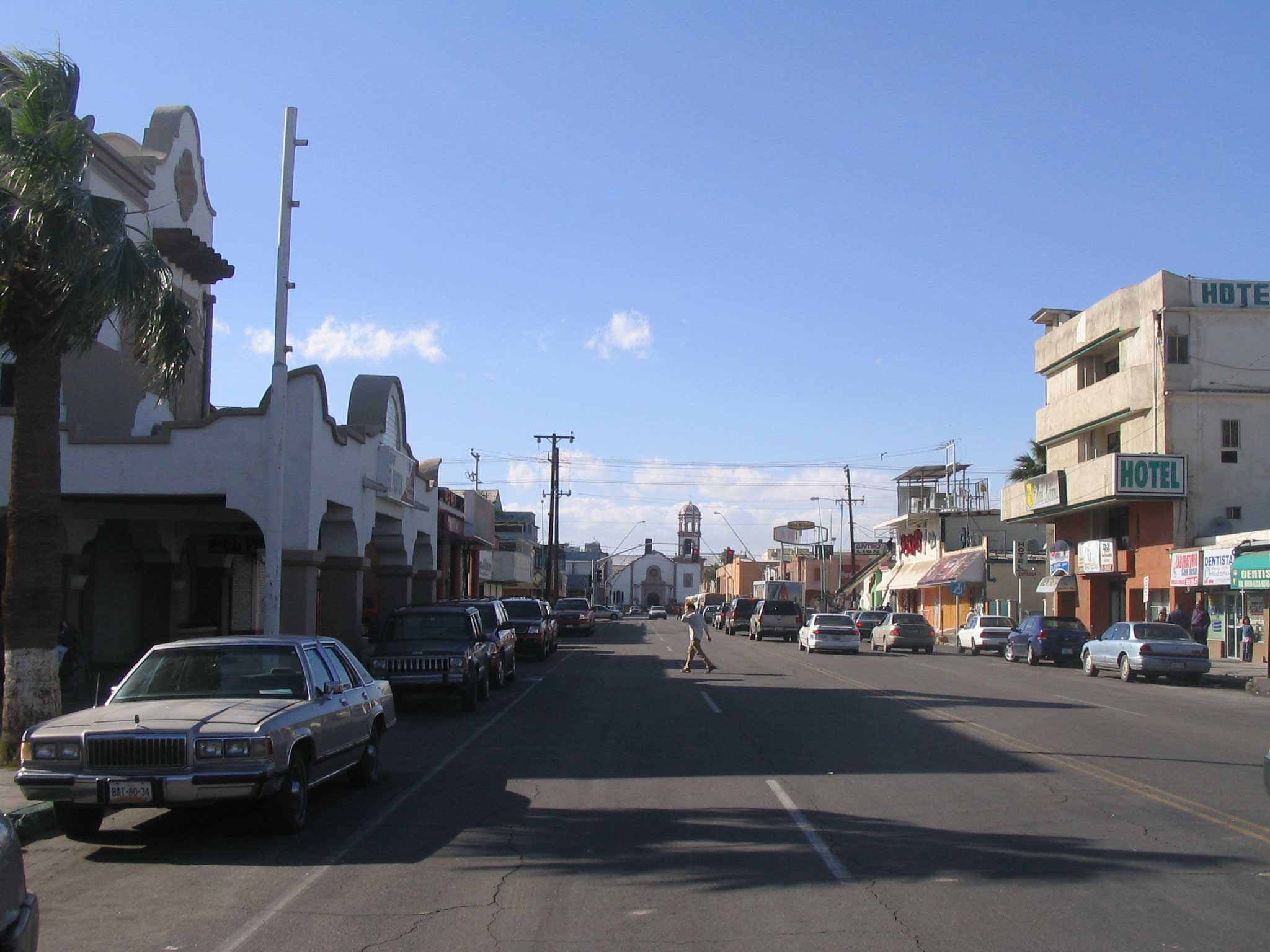
Avenida Reforma in downtown

Mexicali is located at a Junction of major interstates and federal highways. These include Interstate 8, leading from San Diego to the Arizona Sun Corridor where the cities of Phoenix and Tucson dominate, Federal Highway 2, which leads east to San Luis Río Colorado and west to Tijuana, and Federal Highway 5 connecting San Felipe with Mexicali. Other roads lead southwest to Ensenada or north to the Imperial Valley.

The road system in the city of Mexicali and its conurbation is very complex. Over the urban area long boulevards are traversed from one end of which most are 6 lanes with a median of 2 lanes. The backbone of the city is the Lazaro Cardenas Boulevard extending from east to west. Other important boulevards include: Adolfo Lopez Mateos, Benito Juárez, Anáhuac, Justo Sierra, Venustiano Carranza, Manuel Gómez Morin, Francisco L. Montejano, Cetys, Héctor Terán Terán, Independencia and Heroico Colegio Militar, among others. There are two corridors within the city: New River Ecological Corridor, which is guided in the ancient New River bed, and the Palaco Industrial Corridor, this crosses the southern Industrial zone of Mexicali. There is also the beltway, located in the east of the city, connecting the Lazaro Cardenas Blvd. with Islas Agrarias Blvd. and the road to Colonia Abasolo, and this in turn with the Airport Road.

=== Airport ===
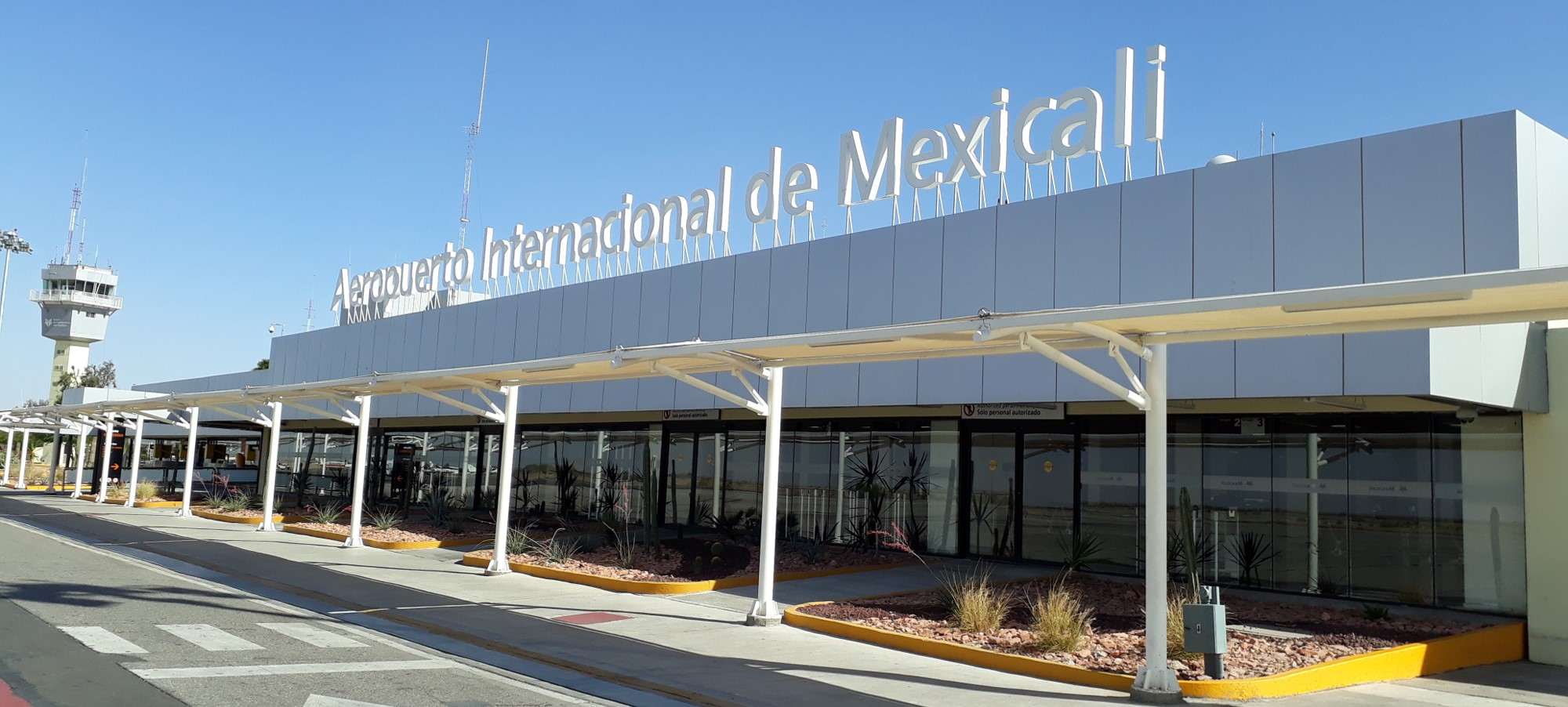
Mexicali International Airport

The city is linked to other Mexican cities by Mexicali International Airport, which serves the city and the surrounding towns.

=== Public transit ===
There are some bus routes across the city and its urban area, where companies like Atusa Plus, Cachanilla, Amarillo y Blanco, among others, offer this service.

== International relations ==
=== Sister cities ===
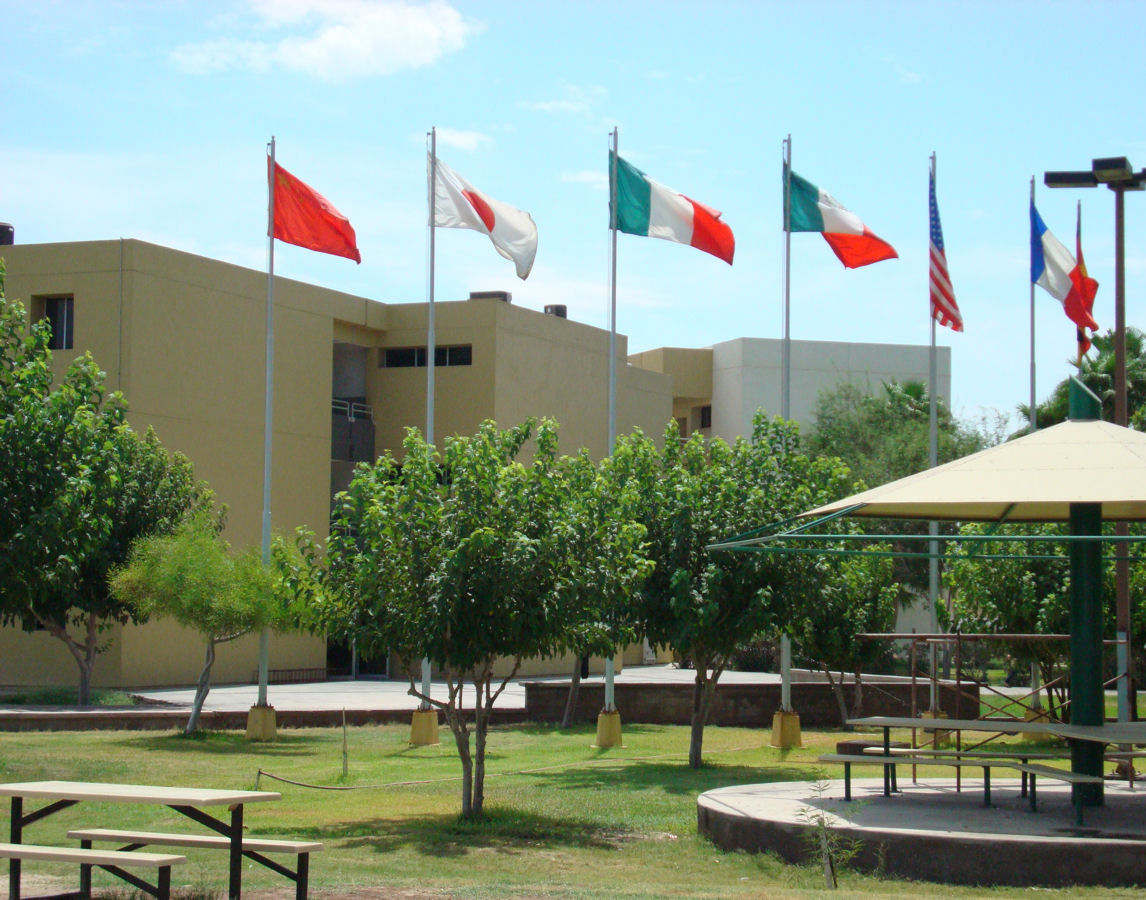
Language department at the Autonomous University of Baja California

Mexicali has the following sister cities:

- San Bernardino, United States
- Nanjing, China
- Gumi, North Gyeongsang, South Korea
- Sacramento, California, United States
- Calexico, California, United States

== See also ==
- List of people from Mexicali
