= Comisión Federal de Electricidad =

Mexican state-owned electric utility company

Federal Electricity Commission
- Native name: Comisión Federal de Electricidad
- Type: Government-owned company
- Industry: Electric utility
- Founded: August 14, 1939; 87 years ago
- Headquarters: Mexico City, Mexico
- Key people: Emilia Esther Calleja Alor (General Director)
- Products: Electric power generation, transmission, and distribution
- Revenue: ▼US$20.6 billion
- Net income: ▼US$682.5 million
- Owner: Government of Mexico
- Number of employees: 10,127
- Website: www.cfe.mx

The Comisión Federal de Electricidad (English: Federal Electricity Commission) is the state-owned electric utility of Mexico, widely known as CFE. The Mexican constitution states that the government is responsible for the control and development of the national electric industry, and CFE carries out this mission. The company's slogan is "Una empresa de clase mundial" ("A World-Class Company").

== Affiliations ==
CFE is not a part of the North American Electric Reliability Corporation, though its transmission system in northern Baja California is part of the Western Electricity Coordinating Council through its interconnection with San Diego Gas & Electric via the Miguel-Tijuana and the LaRosita-Imperial Valley Lines and the Path 45 corridor; it also has a few other interconnections across the border with local utilities in the United States.

On August 2, 2019, the federal government announced it will provide Internet access throughout the country through the establishment of a subsidiary of the Comisión Federal de Electricidad called CFE Telecomunicaciones e Internet para Todos - CFE-TEIT (CFE Telecommunications and Internet for All).

== Takeover of Luz y Fuerza del Centro ==
Logo of Luz y Fuerza del Centro

On 12 October 2009, President Felipe Calderón issued a decree dissolving Luz y Fuerza del Centro (LFC, also rendered on logo as "LyF"), the state-owned power company serving most of central Mexico—including Mexico City, most of the State of Mexico and some communities in the states of Morelos, Hidalgo and Puebla. The government claimed that spending had outpaced sales; turning a blind eye to the true reasons for such situation, it instead scapegoated it due to massive featherbedding, and it no longer made sense for the company to stay afloat. According to the government, spending at the company was increasingly outpacing sales. Years before, CFE went on to control the national electric system and expand its operations nationwide, while the smaller LFC kept a low profile, maintaining its operations in the central region of Mexico.

LFC provided electricity to several states where, by virtue of a federal law, CFE had no operations (a 1985 agreement between CFE and LFC increased the areas served by the former). As of March 2010, LFC's operations had been fully absorbed by CFE.

== Controversies ==
Two corruption scandals in the US cite payments of bribes to officials at the CFE in return for contracts.

=== 2010 ===
In September 2010, ABB, a Swiss corporation, admitted that ABB Network Management, paid bribes to officials at CFE from 1997 to 2004, totaling approximately $1.9 million. In exchange for the bribe payments, according to court documents, ABB received contracts worth more than $81 million in revenue.

The matter was resolved in September 2010 in a US court.

=== 2011 ===
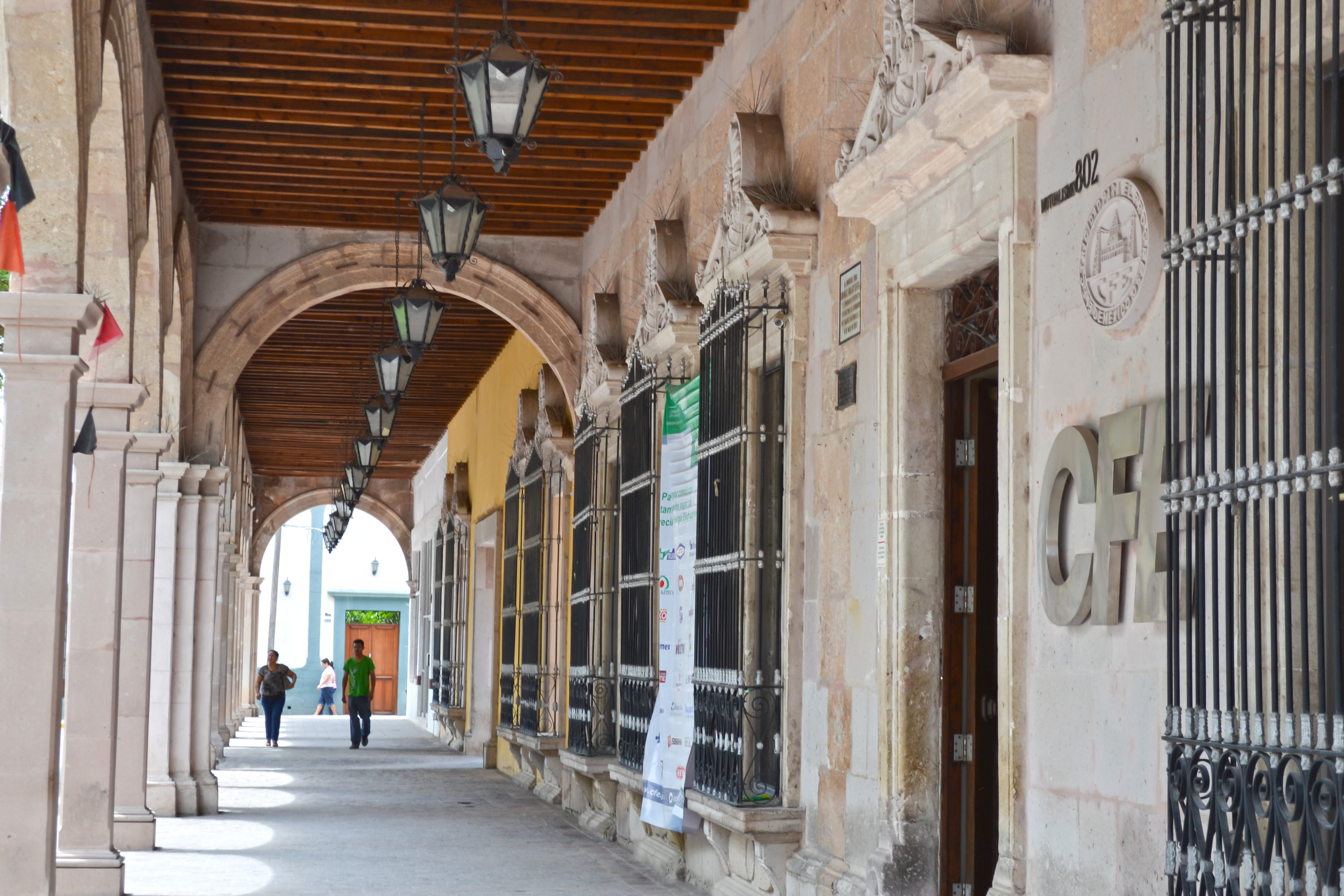
CFE building in Matehuala, San Luis Potosí.

In May 2011, Lindsey Manufacturing Company of the US was convicted by a US federal jury under the Foreign Corrupt Practices Act (FCPA) for their alleged roles in a scheme to pay bribes to officials at the CFE.

The bribes were paid through an intermediary, who allegedly had a corrupt relationship with a senior CFE official. Lindsey Manufacturing allegedly received more than $19 million in CFE business over the course of seven years as a result of working through the intermediary.

According to evidence presented at trial, the intermediary bought a CFE official a $297,500 Ferrari Spyder and a $1.8 million yacht, as well as paying more than $170,000 towards the official's credit card bills. In December 2011, a US District Court dismissed the indictments against Lindsey Manufacturing, citing misconduct by the prosecution. The US Department of Justice (DOJ) said it planned to appeal the dismissal, but in May 2012 the government withdrew its appeal.

=== 2016 ===
==== Enrique Ochoa Reza settlement agreement scandal ====
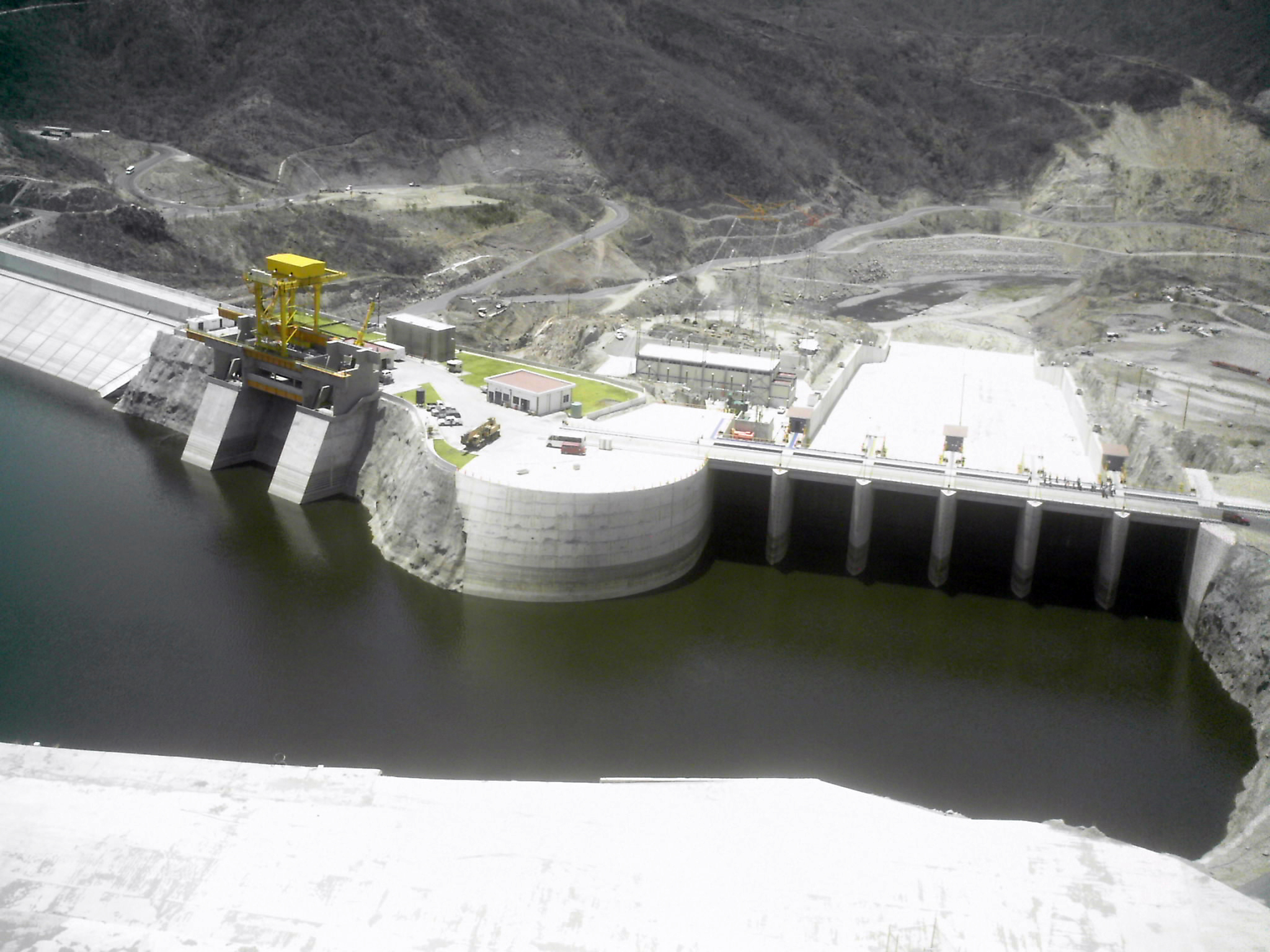
El Cajón dam, in the state of Nayarit, Mexico

In September 2016, it was reported by Pablo Gomez of Aristegui Noticias that Enrique Ochoa Reza, who had stepped down two months earlier as head of the commission after being selected as the leader of his political party, had received a payout of 1,206,000 pesos (approximately US$66,000) in a settlement agreement, despite voluntarily resigning his position. The payment probably constituted a violation of the Mexican Constitution's Article 127, which prohibits settlements of this nature in favour of state-owned corporations' employees (with few exceptions). Furthermore, Ochoa Reza served in the commission's top job for only two years and 155 days, while the "Manual de Trabajo de Servidores Publicos de Mando la CFE" (the regulation concerning high-ranking positions in the CFE) clearly stipulates that settlements can only apply after a minimum three years on the job, and only to those individuals whose retirement is not voluntary. Despite the media and popular backlash, Ochoa maintained the settlement agreement was legal. Two months later, in response to the 2016 San Pablito Market fireworks explosion that occurred in Tultepec on December 20, Ochoa announced he had donated the 1.2 million pesos to the UNAM Foundation and the Michou and Mau Foundation, which specializes in the rehabilitation of children with severe burns.

=== 2020 blackout ===
Millions of people in Mexico City, State of Mexico, Nuevo León, Hidalgo, Jalisco, Sinaloa, Yucatán, Tamaulipas, Coahuila, Guanajuato, San Luis Potosí, Oaxaca, Veracruz, and other states were left without electricity for several hours during a blackout that began at 2:29 p.m. CST on December 28, 2020; restoration of service began twenty-three minutes later and was completely restored by 4:12 p.m. The Centro Nacional de Control de Energía ("National Center for Energy Control, CENACE) said the blackout was due to an “imbalance in the National Interconnected System between the load and the power generation causing a loss of approximately 7,500 MW” and that automatic protection schemes were activated in order to avoid a greater risk due to the incident in the system. Manuel Bartlett, director of CFE, and Carlos Meléndez, general director of CENACE, said that there was no damage to the national electricity system, nor there was any economic loss due to the blackout.

CFE reported on December 30 that the blackout was caused by a fire in 30 hectares (74 acres) of grasslands in the municipality of Padilla, Tamaulipas. However, the Tamaulipas State Civil Protection Coordination rejected the document presented by the CFE, saying the document was falsified, and the state announced on January 3, 2021, that it planned to sue the CFE. Meanwhile, President Andrés Manuel López Obrador reiterated his support for Manuel Bartlett and promised that a similar blackout would not occur again.

After the state of Tamaulipas threatened to sue, Bartlett admitted the accusation of grassfires had been falsified and suggested the blackout was caused by renewable energy sources.

=== February 2021 winter storm ===
The February 13–17, 2021 North American winter storm caused blackouts in Texas and northern Mexico and cost at least three dozen lives in Mexico and the United States. 5.9 million users were directly affected users in Nuevo León, Coahuila, Tamaulipas, and Chihuahua along the Texas border and users in Aguascalientes, Colima, State of México, Guanajuato, Guerrero, Jalisco, Michoacán, Nayarit, Puebla, Querétaro, San Luis Potosí, and Zacatecas were indirectly affected by rolling blackouts. Rocío Nahle García, Secretary of Energy, asked the populace to save energy, and AMLO announced that Mexico would increase the use of oil and coal to produce electricity as well as purchase three shiploads of natural gas to deal with power shortages. He also warned that periodic local outages would continue through February 21. 100% of power was restored by the afternoon of February 17.

== Proposed reforms 2021 ==
On February 1, 2021, President Andrés Manuel López Obrador (AMLO) sent an initiative to reform the Electricity Industry Law to the Congress of the Union. The proposal, which must be approved in 30 days, would reverse the energy reform approved under former president Enrique Peña Nieto. There are four priorities: 1) hydroelectric energy, 2) other energy produced by CFE (nuclear, geothermal, thermoelectric, and combined cycle gas turbines), 3) wind and solar energy produced by individuals, and 4) other. AMLO argues that previous reforms were made with the intention of privatizing the energy sector and will require either massive subsidies or huge price increases for consumers.

CFE declared on February 12 that if the current scheme of contracts with independent energy producers (PIE) is maintained, the damage to the nation is estimated at MXN $412 billion due to subsidies, exchange risks and inflation, low dispatch, and rising rates. MXN $56.18 billion corresponds to the Spanish-owned Iberdrola for the La Venta wind farm in Oaxaca. CFE estimates that an end to the subsidies will save consumers 20%-30%.

== See also ==
- Electricity sector in Mexico
