= Novi Svet =

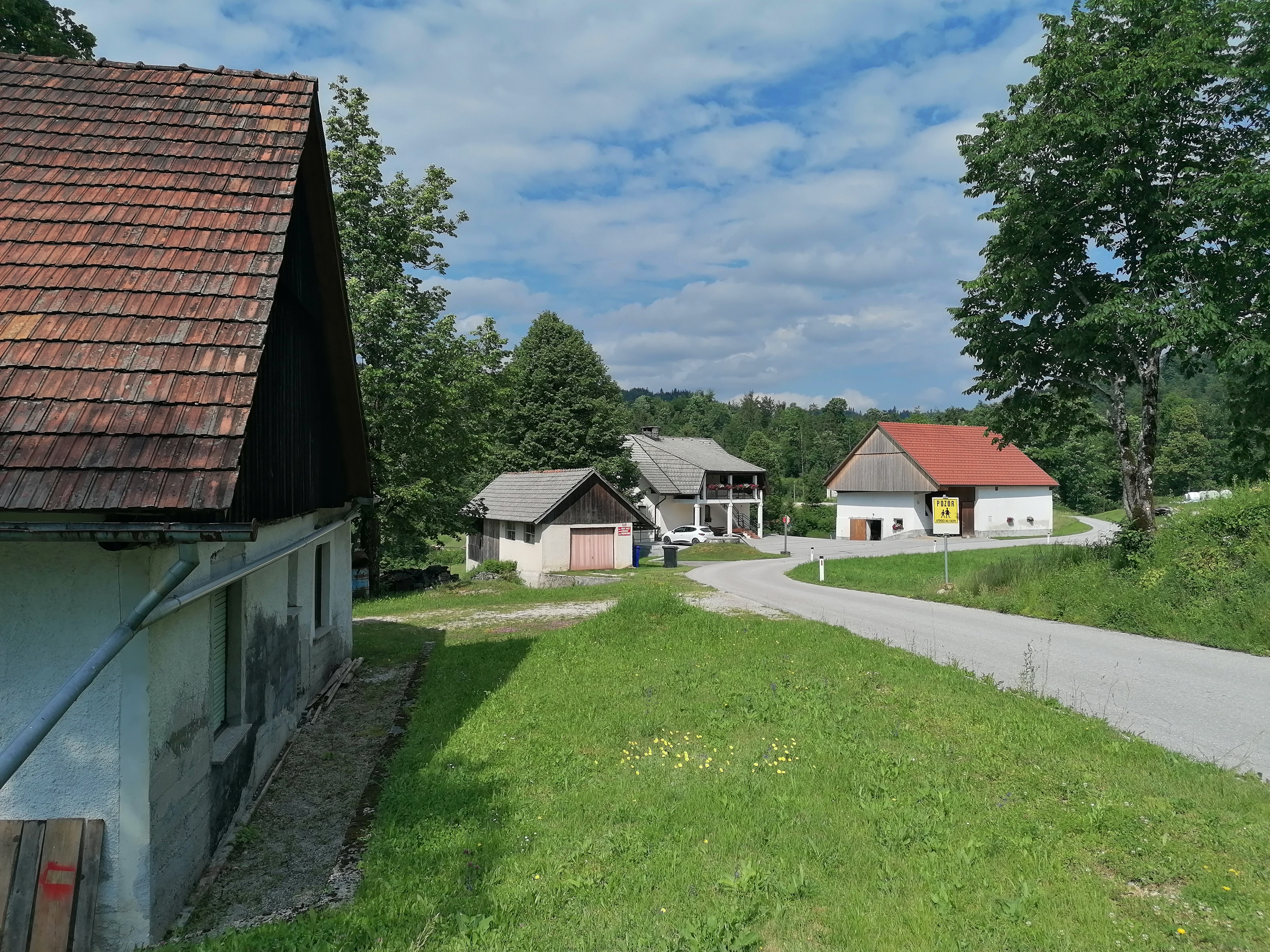

- Location in Slovenia
- Coordinates: 45°54′25.2″N 14°8′34.76″E
- Country: Slovenia
- Traditional region: Inner Carniola
- Statistical region: Central Slovenia
- Municipality: Logatec

Area
  - Total: 22.34 km^{2} (8.63 sq mi)
- Elevation: 525.9 m (1,725 ft)

Population (2002)
  - Total: 94

Novi Svet (pronounced [ˈnɔːʋi ˈsʋeːt], German: Neuwelt, Italian: Mondonovo) is a dispersed settlement in the hills west of Hotedršica in the Municipality of Logatec in the Inner Carniola region of Slovenia.

== Geography ==
Novi Svet ranges across elevations between 500 and 600 meters (1,600 and 2,000 ft) southwest of the road from Kalce to Hotedršica, extending to the northeast slope of the Hrušica Plateau. It includes the hamlets of Gorenji Novi Svet (German: Oberneuwelt, Italian: Mondonovo di Sopra) to the northwest and Dolenji Novi Svet (German: Unterneuwelt) to the southeast, as well as the isolated Vrbanček farm. The area is mostly covered by needleleaf forest with many karst dells, sinkholes, and caves. The village has little arable land and sparse meadows, and so its residents have traditionally made a living from forestry.

== Name ==
The name Novi Svet literally means 'new area, new territory'. The name refers to the fact that the area was settled more recently than neighboring villages after wooded land was cleared.

== History ==
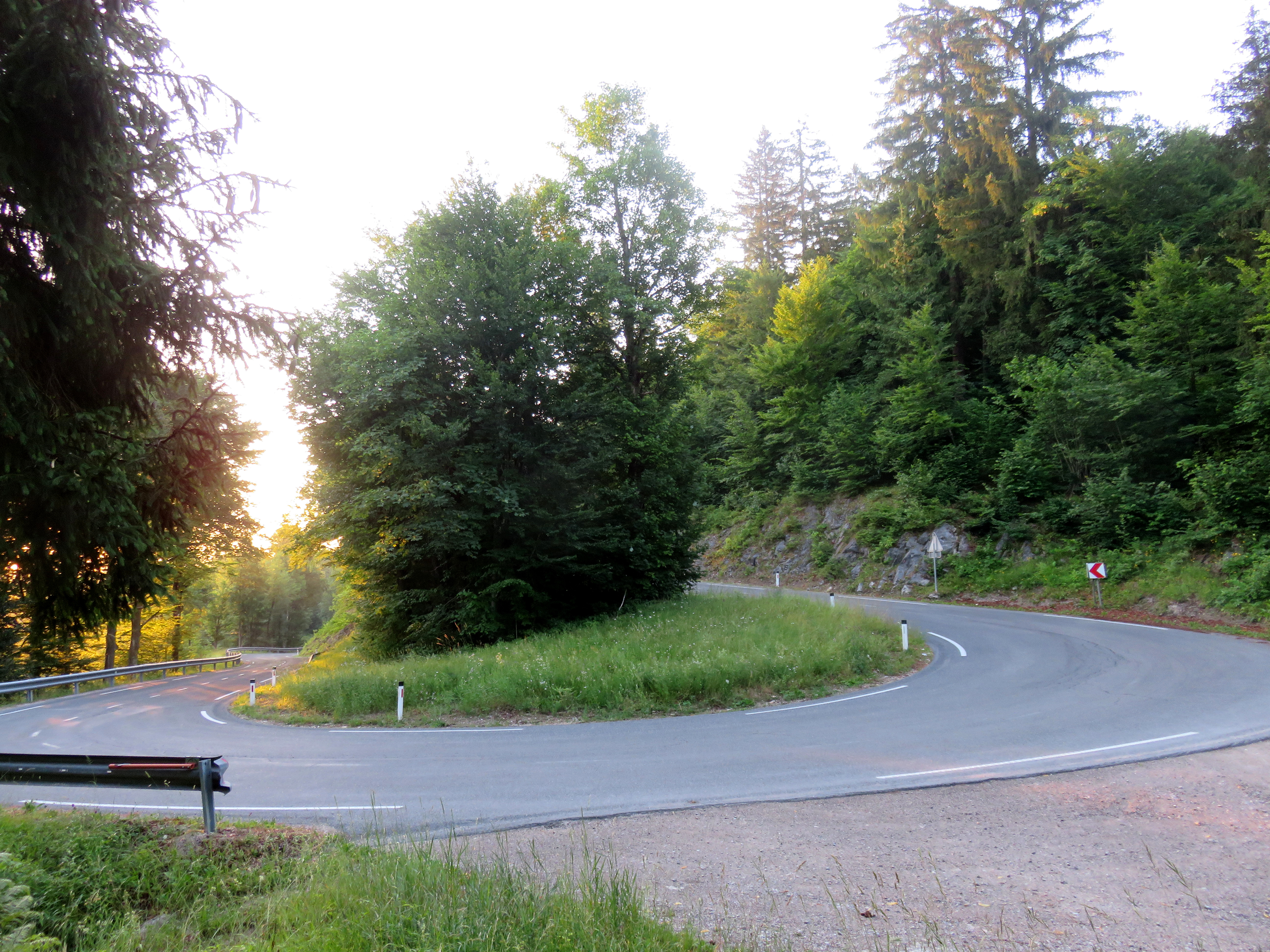
The Russian Curve (Ruska rajda), a road built by Russian POWs during the First World War

Some Slavic settlement may have already taken place in Novi Svet as early as the sixth century. Novi Svet was mentioned in historical sources in the 15th century in connection with iron working; the blast furnace that it supplied shut down in the 1589 due to a lack of ore. Settlers are said to have arrived in larger numbers in Novi Svet from Veharše in nearby Medvedje Brdo after the iron mining was abandoned there in the late 16th century, and also during French rule in the early 19th century in an effort to avoid military service.

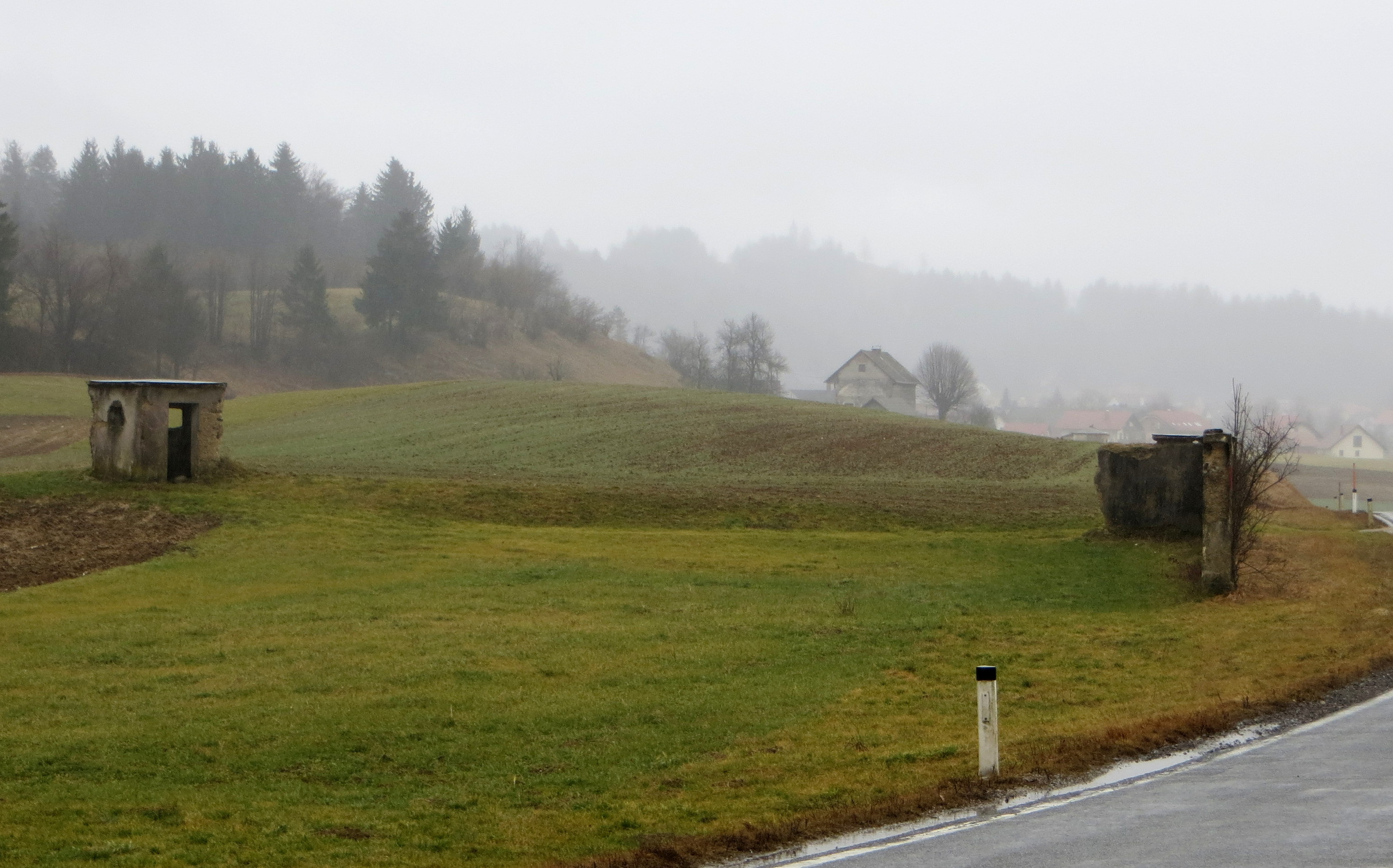
Italian customs post

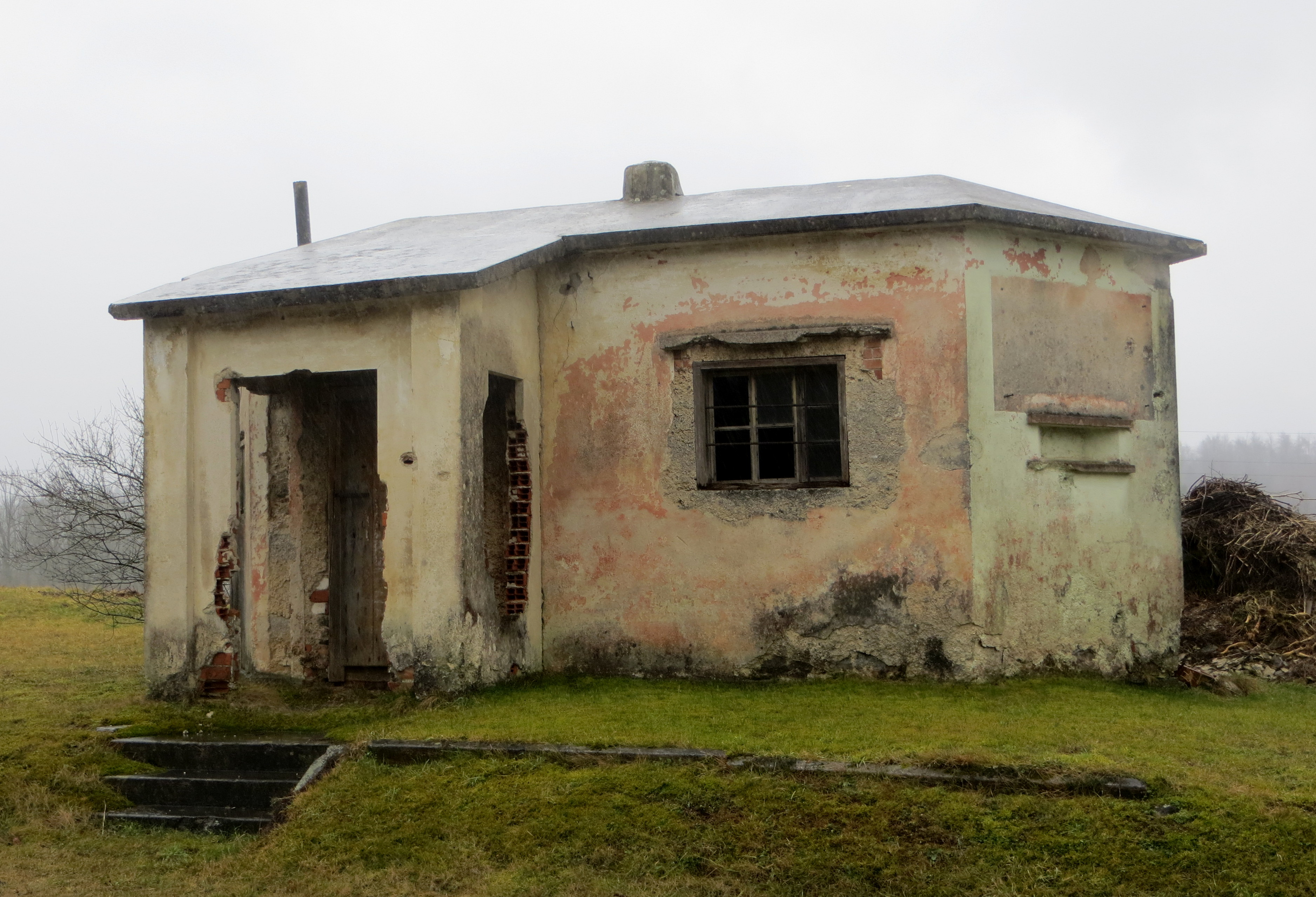
Italian border post

Interwar border infrastructure

During the First World War, Russian prisoners of war were used for labor in the area. The projects they worked on included building the road from Kalce to Podkraj; there is a curve along the road in the territory of Novi Svet known as Ruska rajda 'the Russian Curve', named after the prisoners.

Between the First and Second World Wars, the territory of Novi Svet lay west of the Rapallo border, in the Kingdom of Italy. The remains of the Italian border and customs posts along the road from Hotedršica to Godovič are located in the northeastern territory of Novi Svet.
