= Rovte =

Rovte is a Slovene geographical name that may refer to:

- Rovte v Selški Dolini, a settlement in the Municipality of Škofja Loka in Slovenia
- Rovte, Logatec, a settlement in the Municipality of Logatec in Slovenia
- Rovte, Radovljica, a settlement in the Municipality of Radovljica in Slovenia
- Rovte Hills, a group of hills in western Slovenia
- the old name for the settlement Gozd–Martuljek in northwestern Slovenia
