= Rovte Hills =

Coordinates: 45°58′54″N 14°10′9″E

The Rovte Hills (Slovene: Rovtarsko hribovje; also known as Logatec–Žiri Rovte, Logaško-Žirovske Rovte) are a group of hills in western Slovenia.

== Geography ==
The Rovte Hills are a hilly prealpine area between the Žiri Basin (Slovene: Žirovska kotlina) and the Logatec Karst Field (Slovene: Logaško polje) through which the Škofja Loka Hills (Slovene: Škofjeloško hribovje) and Polhov Gradec Hills (Slovene: Polhograjsko hribovje) transition into the karst area of the Idrija Hills (Slovene: Idrijsko hribovje), Hotedršica Lowland (Slovene: Hotenjsko podolje), and Logatec Basin. The hills are named after Rovte, which is the largest settlement in the area. Most of the area is part of the Ljubljanica and Sora watersheds, and a smaller portion is part of the Idrijca watershed. Many creeks rise in the central part of the hills, composed of impermeable rock. These include Sovra Creek, Rovtarica Creek, Hotenjka Creek, and White Creek (Slovene: Bela), and they have carved ravines into the hills. Rounded hills rise above them, with typical names such as Marinc Hill (Slovene: Marinčev grič), Bear Hill (Slovene: Medvedje brdo), and Grass Peak (Slovene: Travni vrh), as well as small karstified plateaus. Permeable rock predominates on the margins of the hills, where larger watercourses have carved deep valleys. The highest point in the Rovte Hills is Three Kings Peak (Slovene: Vrh Sv. Treh Kraljev, 884 meters or 2,900 feet). The elevation of the valley bottoms drops to around 500 meters (1,600 ft).

== History ==
The Rovte Hills were not settled until the late Middle Ages. Isolated farms were created in clearings, followed by hamlets and dispersed villages. The oldest settlements in the hills include Vrh Svetih Treh Kraljev, Hleviše, Zaplana, and Medvedje Brdo.

== Peaks ==
The majority of peaks in the Rovte Hills are between 500 meters (1,600 ft) and 900 meters (3,000 ft) meters in elevation. The highest are:

- Three Kings Peak (Slovene: Vrh Sv. Treh Kraljev, 884 meters or 2,900 feet)
- Čemun Peak (Slovene: Čemunski vrh, 837 meters or 2,746 feet)
- Kovk Hill (824 meters or 2,703 feet)
- Jelenšek Hill (812 meters or 2,664 feet)
- Ulovka Hill (801 meters or 2,628 feet)
