= Jakovica =

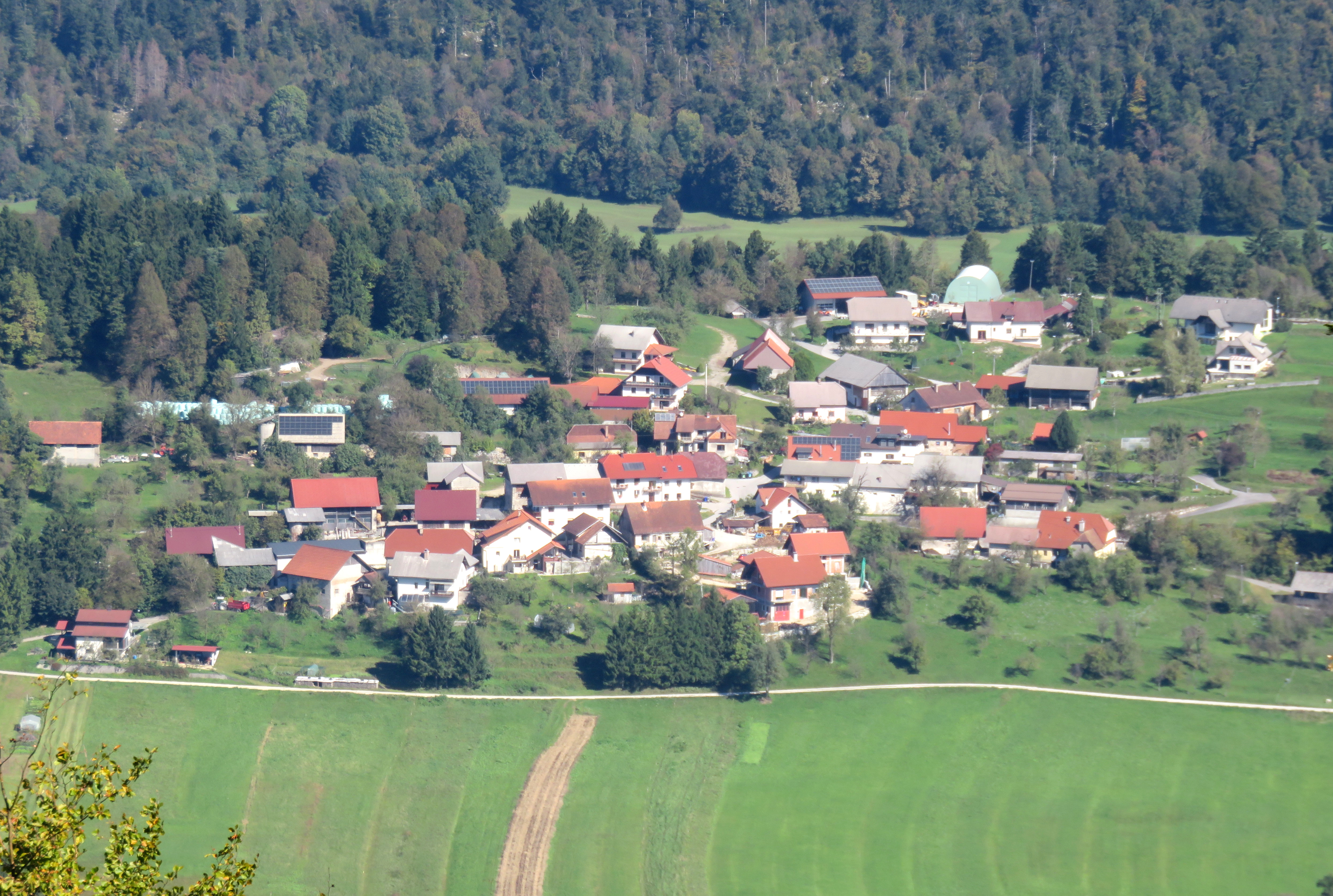

- Location in Slovenia
- Coordinates: 45°51′46.26″N 14°15′0.63″E
- Country: Slovenia
- Traditional region: Inner Carniola
- Statistical region: Central Slovenia
- Municipality: Logatec

Area
  - Total: 8.95 km^{2} (3.46 sq mi)
- Elevation: 480.6 m (1,577 ft)

Population (2002)
  - Total: 80

Jakovica (pronounced [jaˈkɔːʋitsa], German: Jakobowitz) is a small village west of Laze in the Municipality of Logatec in the Inner Carniola region of Slovenia.

== Geography ==
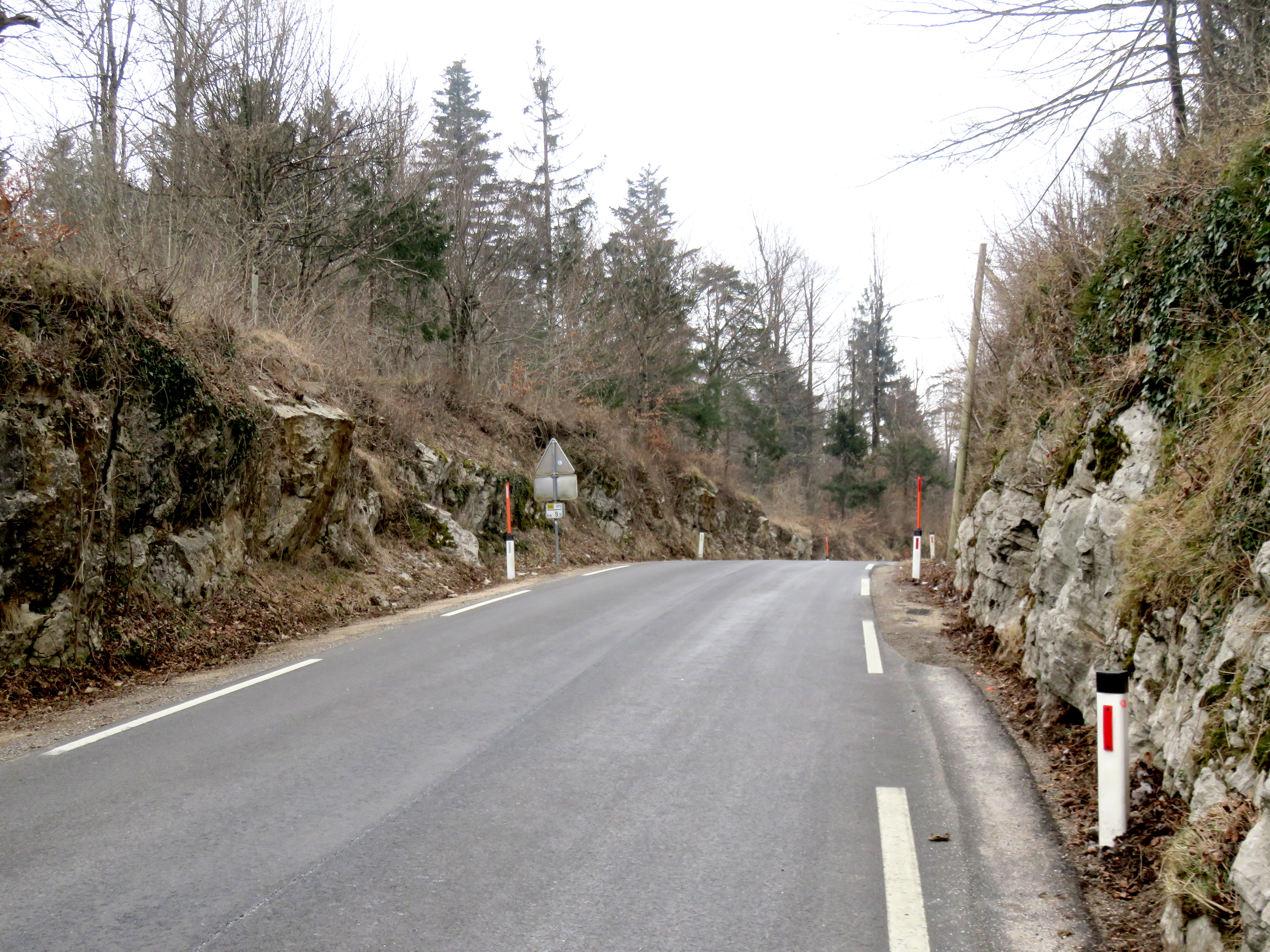
The road at Croat Peak (Vrh Hrvatov)

Jakovica is a clustered village on the western slope of Jakovica Hill (Slovene: Jakovski grič, elevation: 508 meters or 1,667 feet), from which it descends to the Planina Karst Field (Slovene: Planinsko polje). It is connected by road to Laze, and the Unica River flows through the karst field below the village. The soil is gravelly and there are tilled fields on the terrace above the village and toward Laze. The meadows below the village are frequently flooded by the Unica River. The neighboring forest is primarily spruce.

There are several active caves where the karst field meets the hills, in an area known as Pod stenami (literally, 'below the walls'). Caves include Raven Cave (Slovene: Vranja jama), which is part of the Cold Cave (Slovene: Mrzla jama) system, and Discovery Cave (Slovene: Najdena jama), a shaft where subterranean passages of the Unica River are revealed during low water levels.

Croat Peak (Slovene: Vrh Hrvatov, elevation: 550 meters or 1,800 feet) stands northeast of the village, at the highest point along the old road from Logatec to Rakek. It is believed to have been named during the First World War, when Russian prisoners of war were engaged in improving the road between Logatec and Laze. Locals heard the prisoners speaking among themselves and mistakenly assumed that they were Croats.

== Church ==
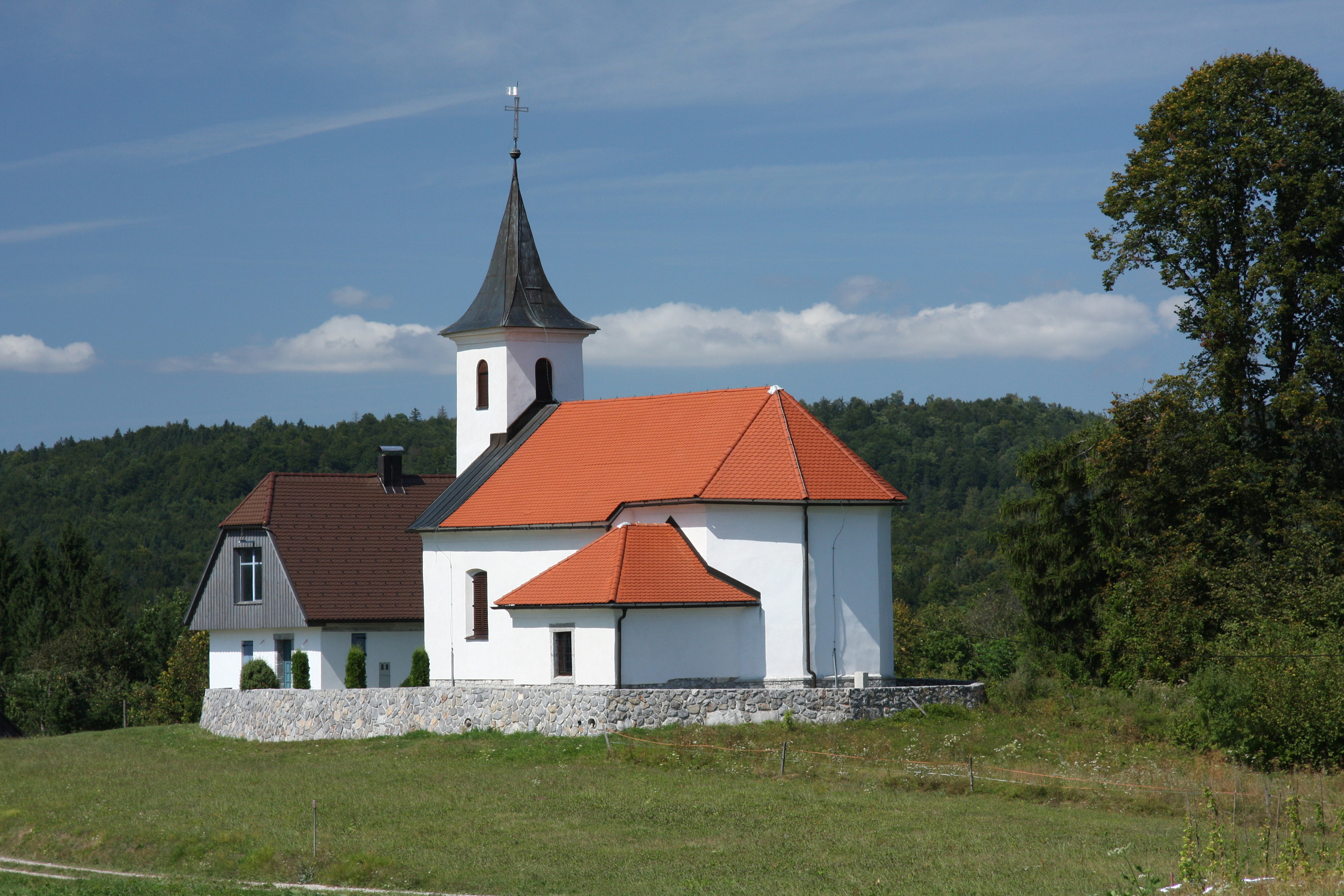
St. Michael's Church in Jakovica

The local church in the settlement is dedicated to Saint Michael and belongs to the Parish of Planina. A small chapel, built at the source of an artesian spring believed to have healing properties, particularly for various eye diseases and disorders, is dedicated to the Virgin Mary.
