= Zaplana =

Zaplana may refer to:

- Zaplana, Vrhnika
- Eduardo Zaplana
- Zaplana, Logatec
