= Grčarevec =

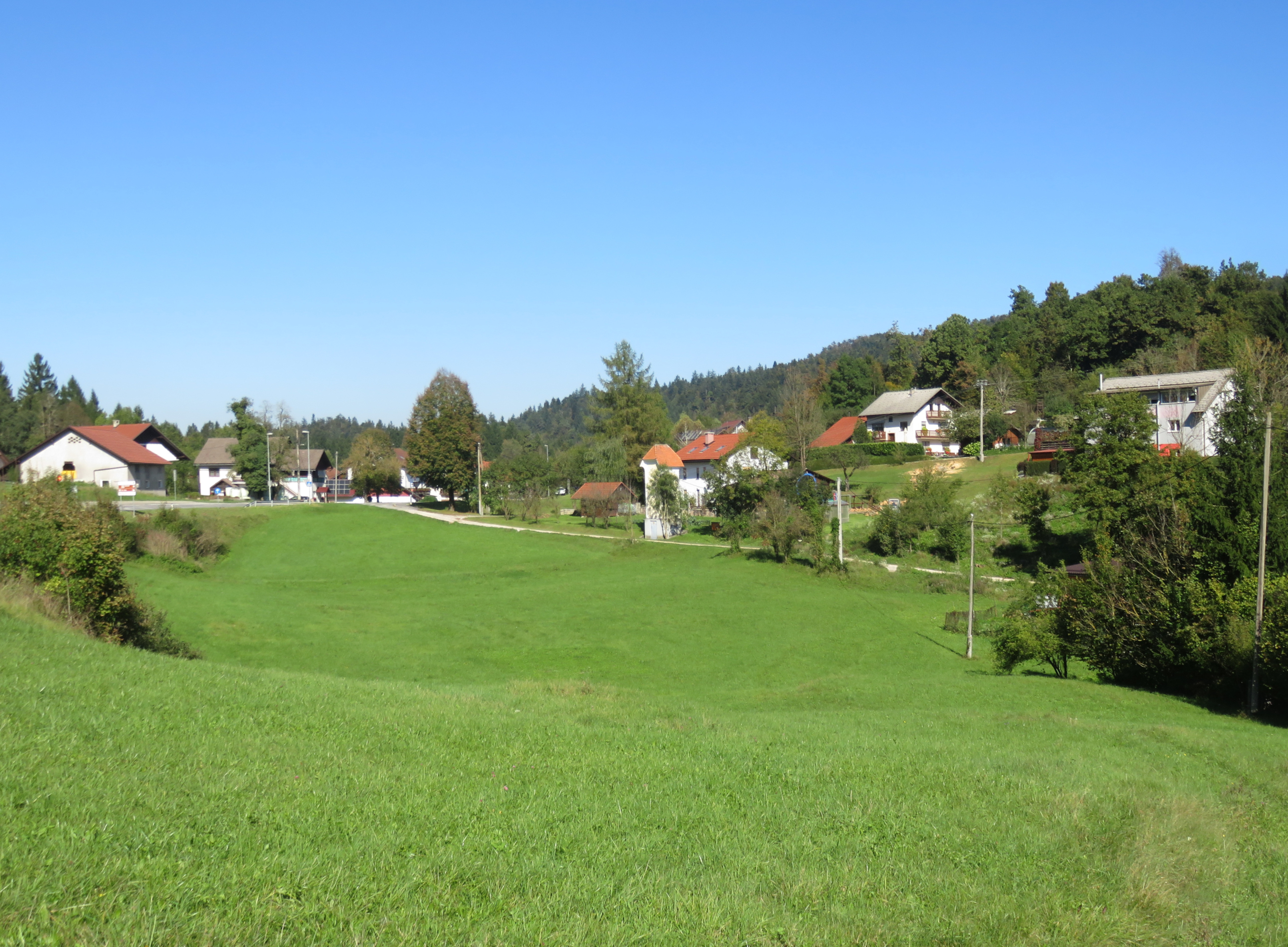

- Location in Slovenia
- Coordinates: 45°52′23.58″N 14°12′46.11″E
- Country: Slovenia
- Traditional region: Inner Carniola
- Statistical region: Central Slovenia
- Municipality: Logatec

Area
  - Total: 3.86 km^{2} (1.49 sq mi)
- Elevation: 471.5 m (1,547 ft)

Population (2002)
  - Total: 143

Grčarevec (pronounced [ɡəɾtʃaˈɾeːʋəts]; in older sources also Gerčarevec, German: Gartschareuz) is a village between Planina and Kalce in the Municipality of Logatec in the Inner Carniola region of Slovenia. In addition to the main settlement of the village, it also comprises the hamlets of Grčarevski Vrh (Slovene: Grčarevski vrh) to the north along the road to Kalce, and Kališe in the forest to the northeast.

== Geography ==
The region around the village contains many springs, the water of which disappears into nearby sinkholes. The surrounding spruce forest is economically important and in the past compensated for the poor soil, which was mainly farmed for corn and potatoes for local use. South of the main settlement is Hotenjke Springs, which contributes to flooding of Planina Karst Field (Slovene: Planinsko polje). There are karst caves around Grčarevec, including 100-meter (330 ft) long Goat Cave (Kozja jama) and the over 100-meter (330 ft) deep Mesar Shaft (Mesarjevo brezno) and Kališnica Shaft, as well as Dolar Cave (Dolarjeva jama), the Gnezd Shaft (Gnezdovo brezno), the Sheep Shaft (Ovčje brezno), and Kališe Cave (Kališka jama). The remains of several woolly rhinoceros were discovered in Dolar Cave in 1933.

== Name ==
It has been suggested that the name Grčarevec may derived from *Gričar 'hill dweller', based on the Slovene common noun grič 'hill'. The settlement was known as Gartschareuz in German.

== Church ==
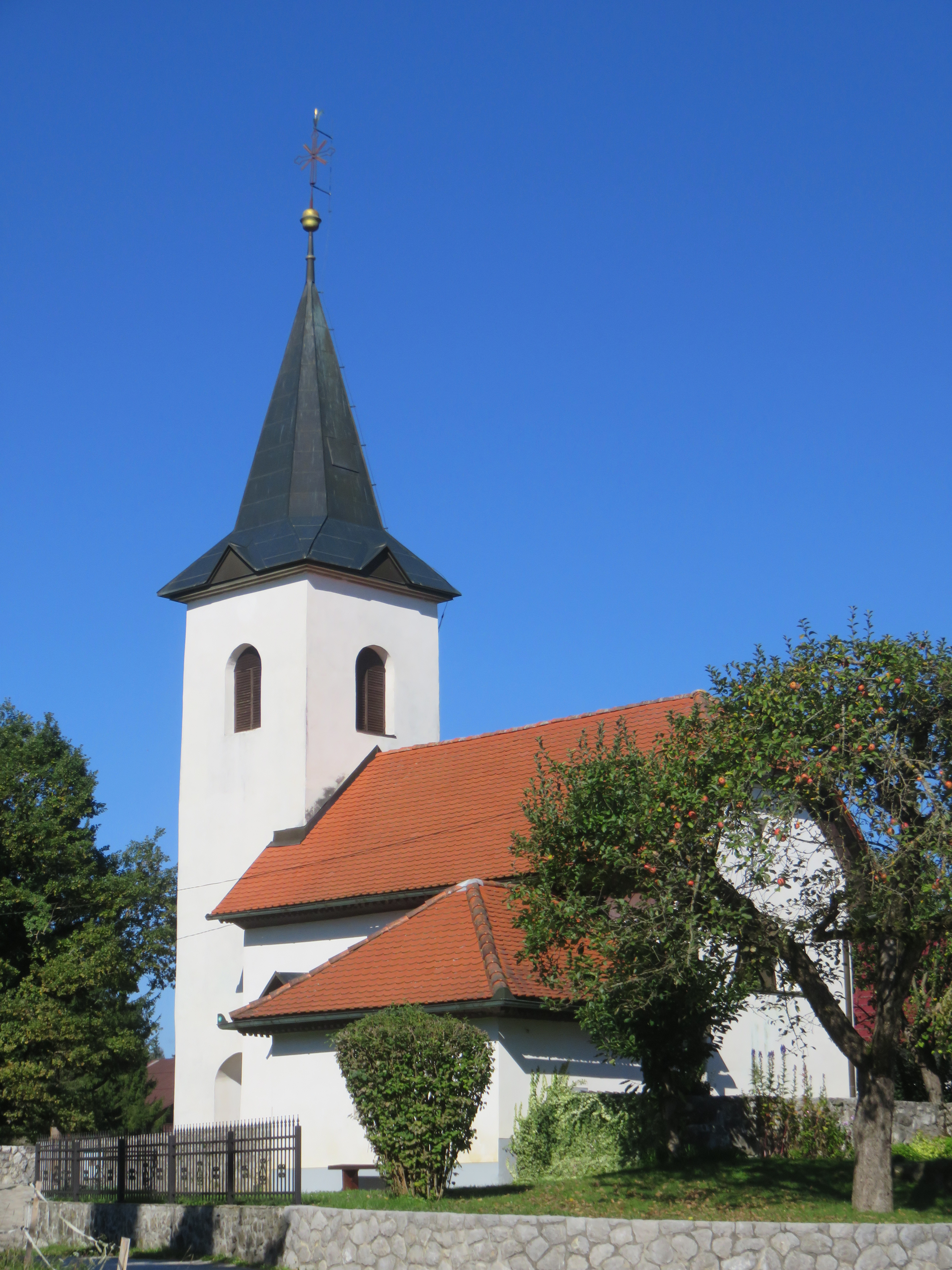
Saint Luke's Church

The local church in the settlement is dedicated to Saint Luke and belongs to the Parish of Planina. The church was built in 1746.
