= Hlevni Vrh =

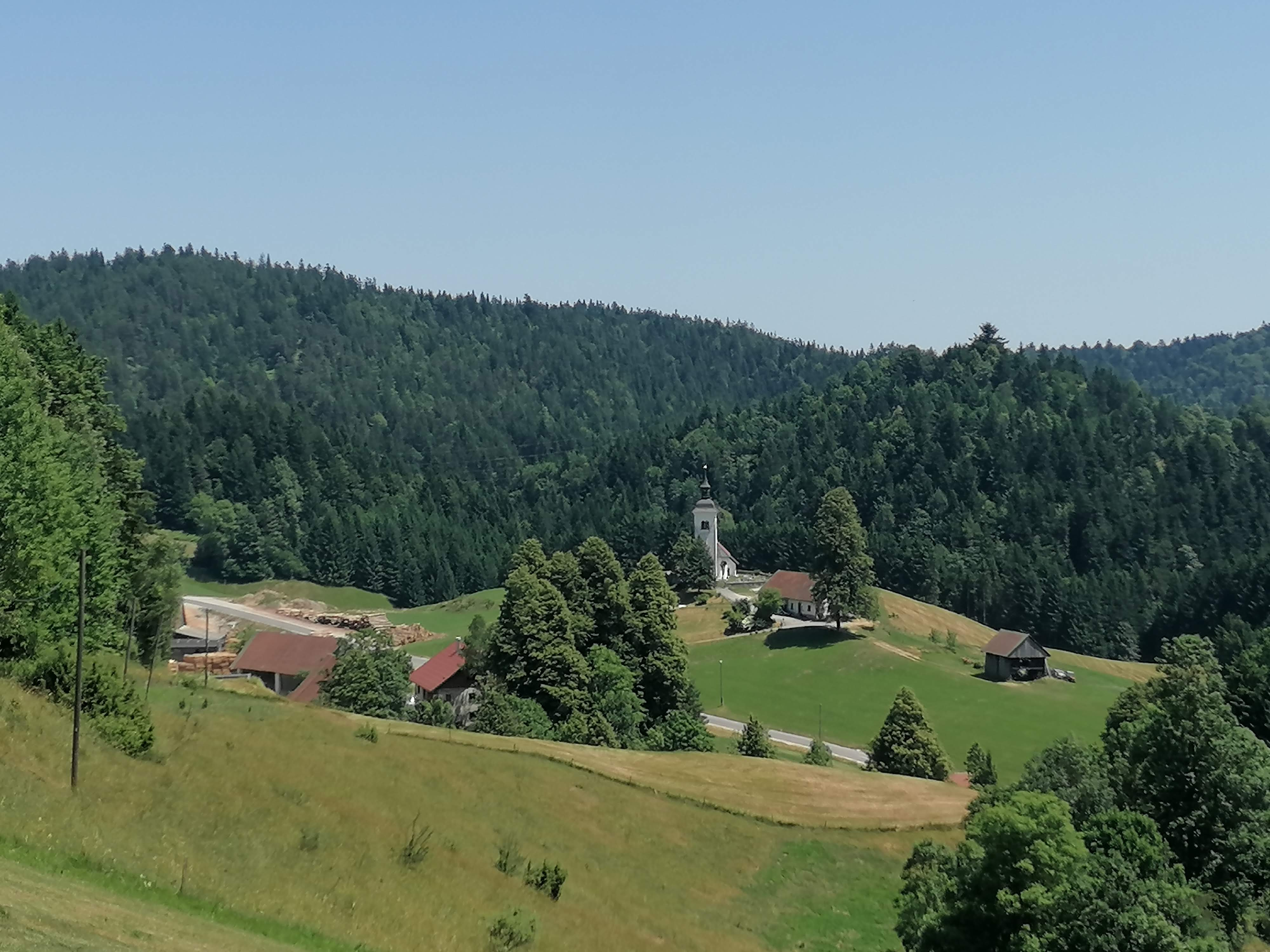
- Hlevni Vrh

- Location in Slovenia
- Coordinates: 46°0′18.14″N 14°10′28.79″E
- Country: Slovenia
- Traditional region: Inner Carniola
- Statistical region: Central Slovenia
- Municipality: Logatec

Area
  - Total: 1.67 km^{2} (0.64 sq mi)
- Elevation: 653.9 m (2,145 ft)

Population (2002)
  - Total: 74

Hlevni Vrh (pronounced [ˈxleːu̯ni ˈʋəɾx], German: Hlewenwerch) is a small dispersed settlement in the hills north of Logatec in the Inner Carniola region of Slovenia. It includes the hamlet of Jezero.

== History ==
According to the land registry of 1560, the village was the seat of an administration that included Dole, Hleviše, Izgorje, Konjski Vrh, Račeva, Vrh Svetih Treh Kraljev, and Zavratec.

== Church ==
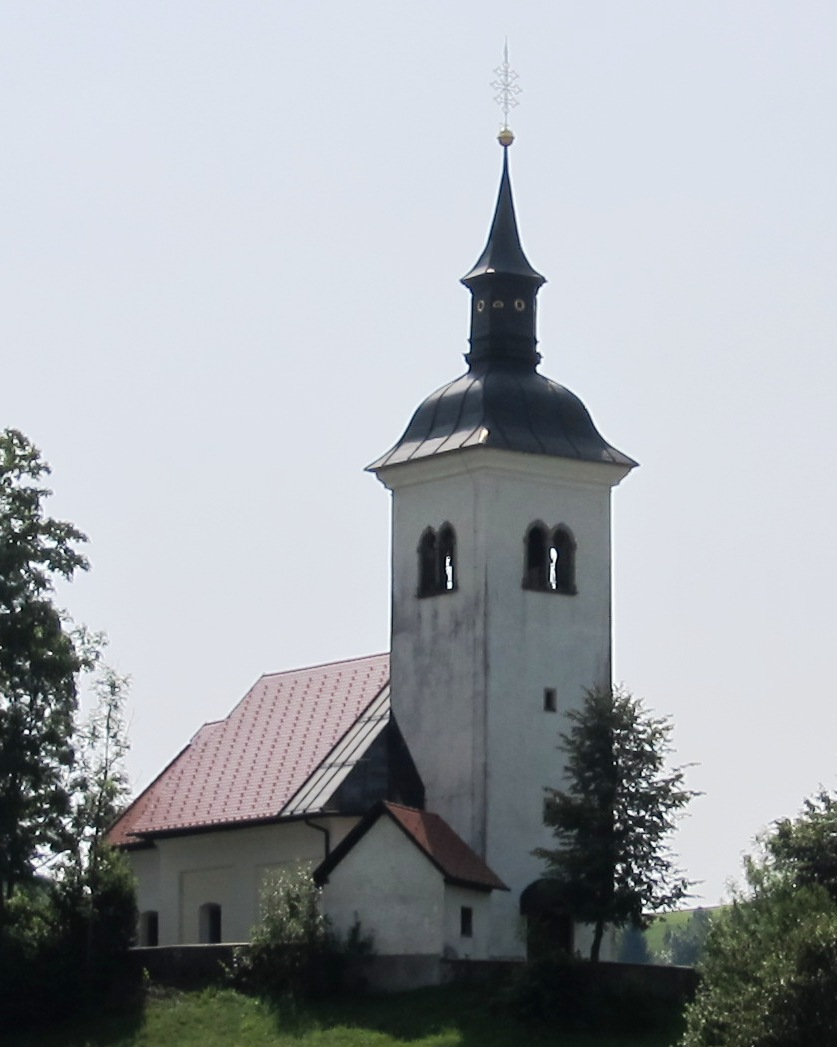
View from the northwest

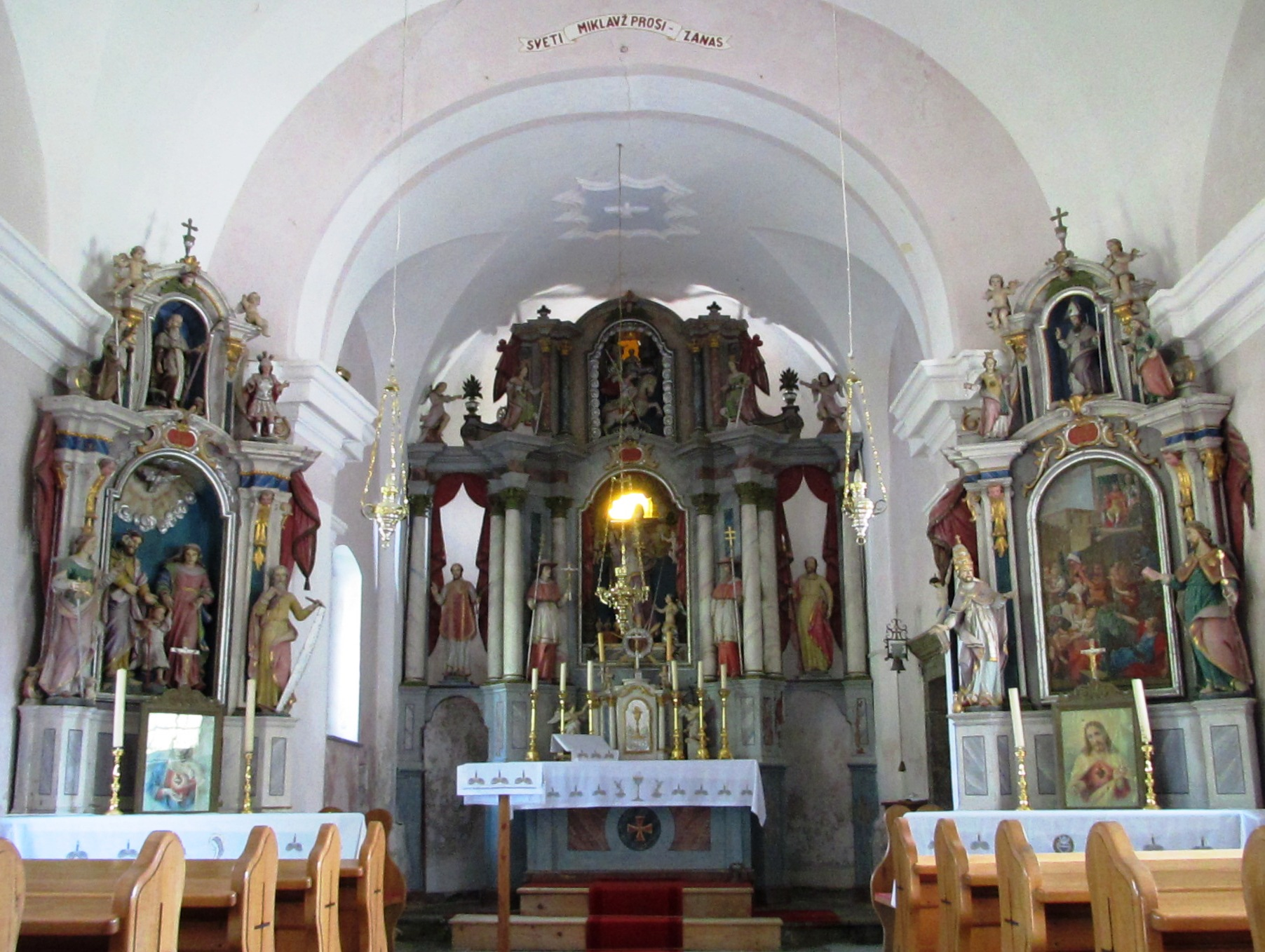
Interior of the church

Saint Nicholas' Church

The local church is dedicated to Saint Nicholas and belongs to the Parish of Vrh Svetih Treh Kraljev. In 973 the church belonged to the Diocese of Freising. The current building dates from the beginning of the 16th century and obtained its current appearance during a Baroque remodeling in the 18th century and is surrounded by a small cemetery. It has an entryway through a belfry with four double-lancet windows, a rectangular nave, and a low, narrow chancel. The interior is richly decorated and contains a stone floor and a crypt.
