= Ravnik pri Hotedršici =

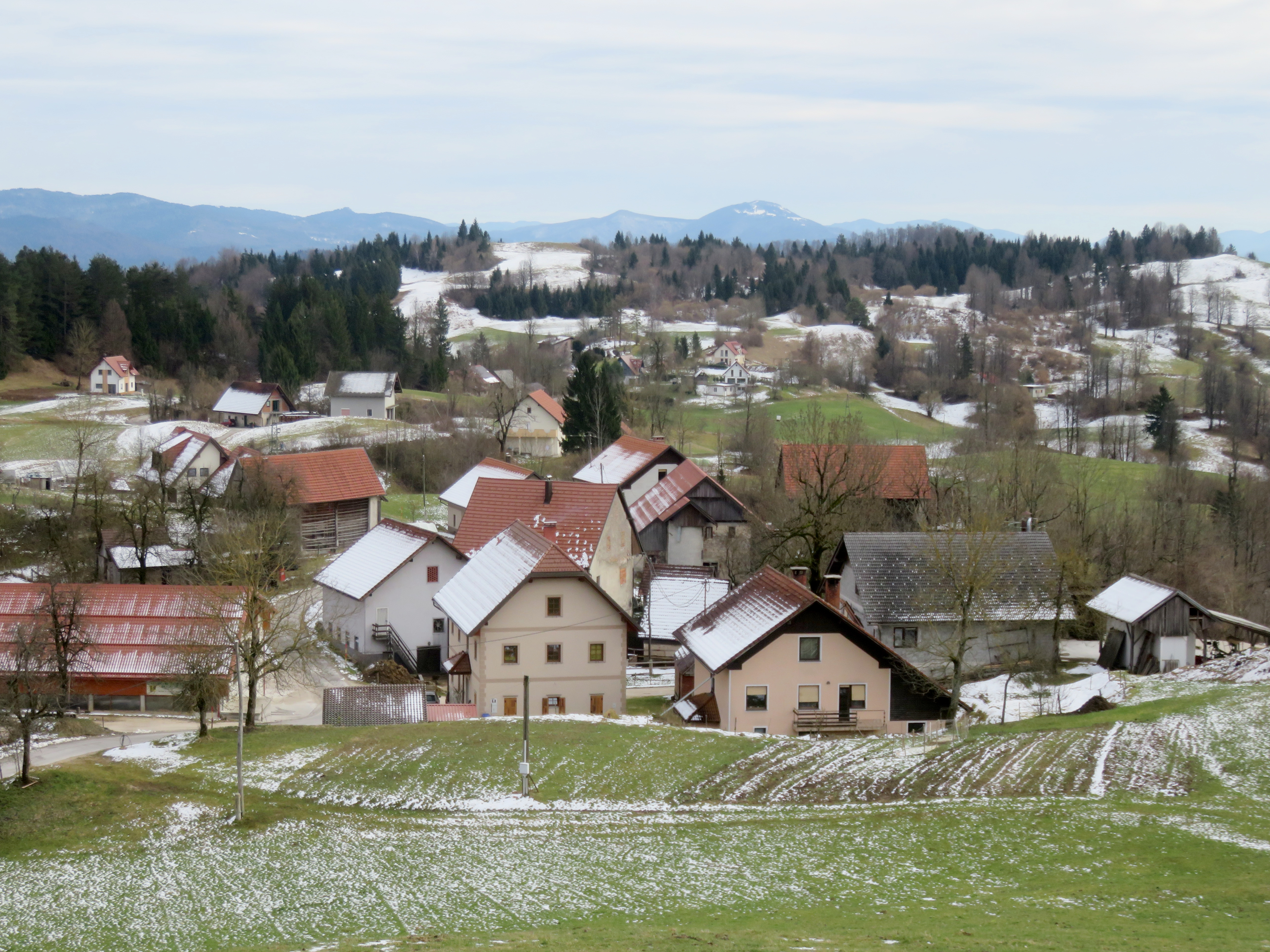

- Location in Slovenia
- Coordinates: 45°55′10.03″N 14°9′36.26″E
- Country: Slovenia
- Traditional region: Inner Carniola
- Statistical region: Central Slovenia
- Municipality: Logatec

Area
  - Total: 3.54 km^{2} (1.37 sq mi)
- Elevation: 636.9 m (2,090 ft)

Population (2002)
  - Total: 53

Ravnik pri Hotedršici (pronounced [ˈɾaːu̯nik pɾi xɔˈteːdəɾʃitsi], German: Raunik) is a small village southeast of Hotedršica in the Municipality of Logatec in the Inner Carniola region of Slovenia.

== Name ==
The name of the settlement was changed from Ravnik to Ravnik pri Hotedršici in 1955.

== Church ==
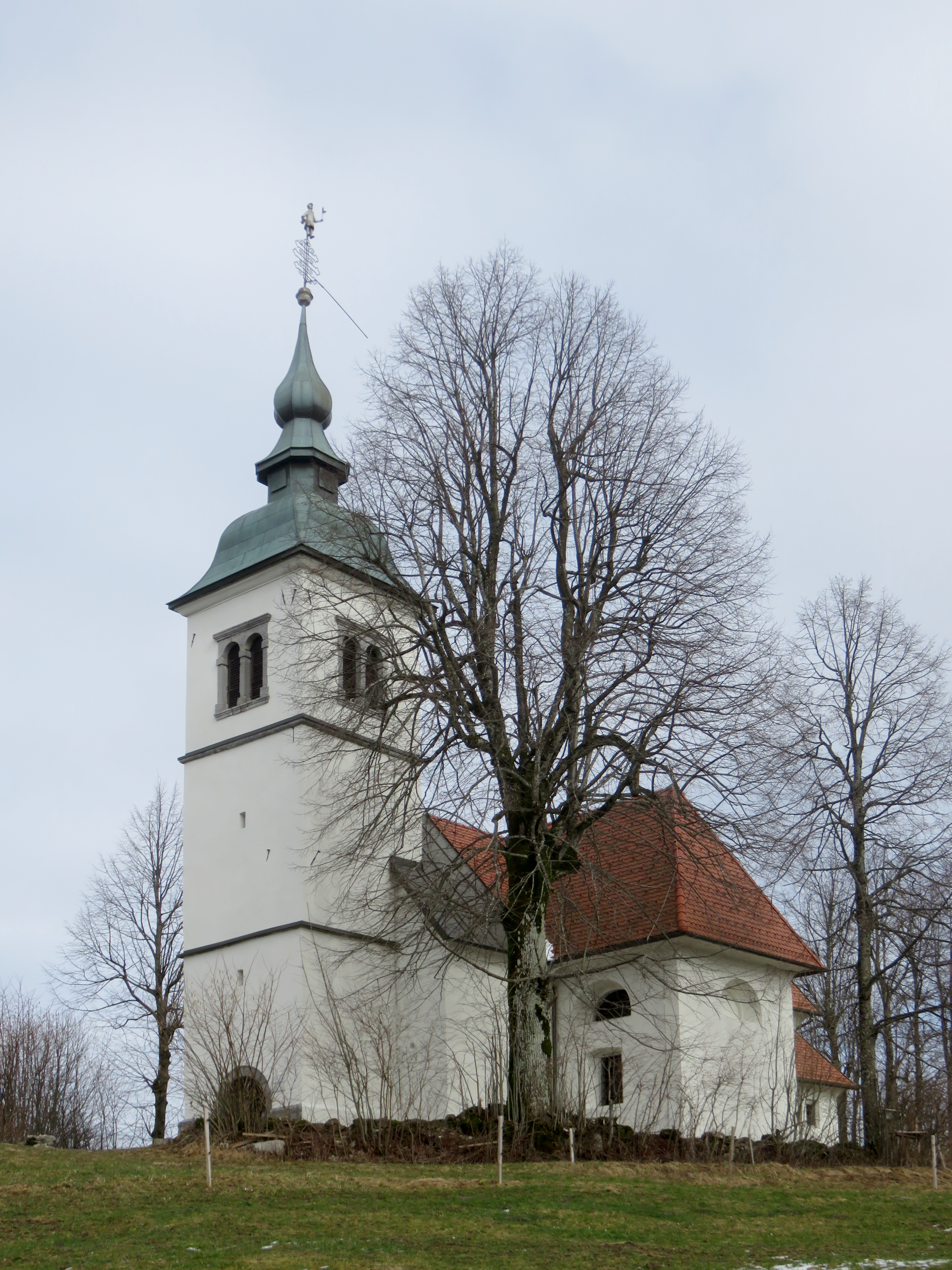
Saint Barbara's Church

The local church is dedicated to Saint Barbara and belongs to the Parish of Hotedršica. It is an old pilgrimage church and has the remains of a defence wall against Ottoman raids in the 15th century.
