= Petkovec =

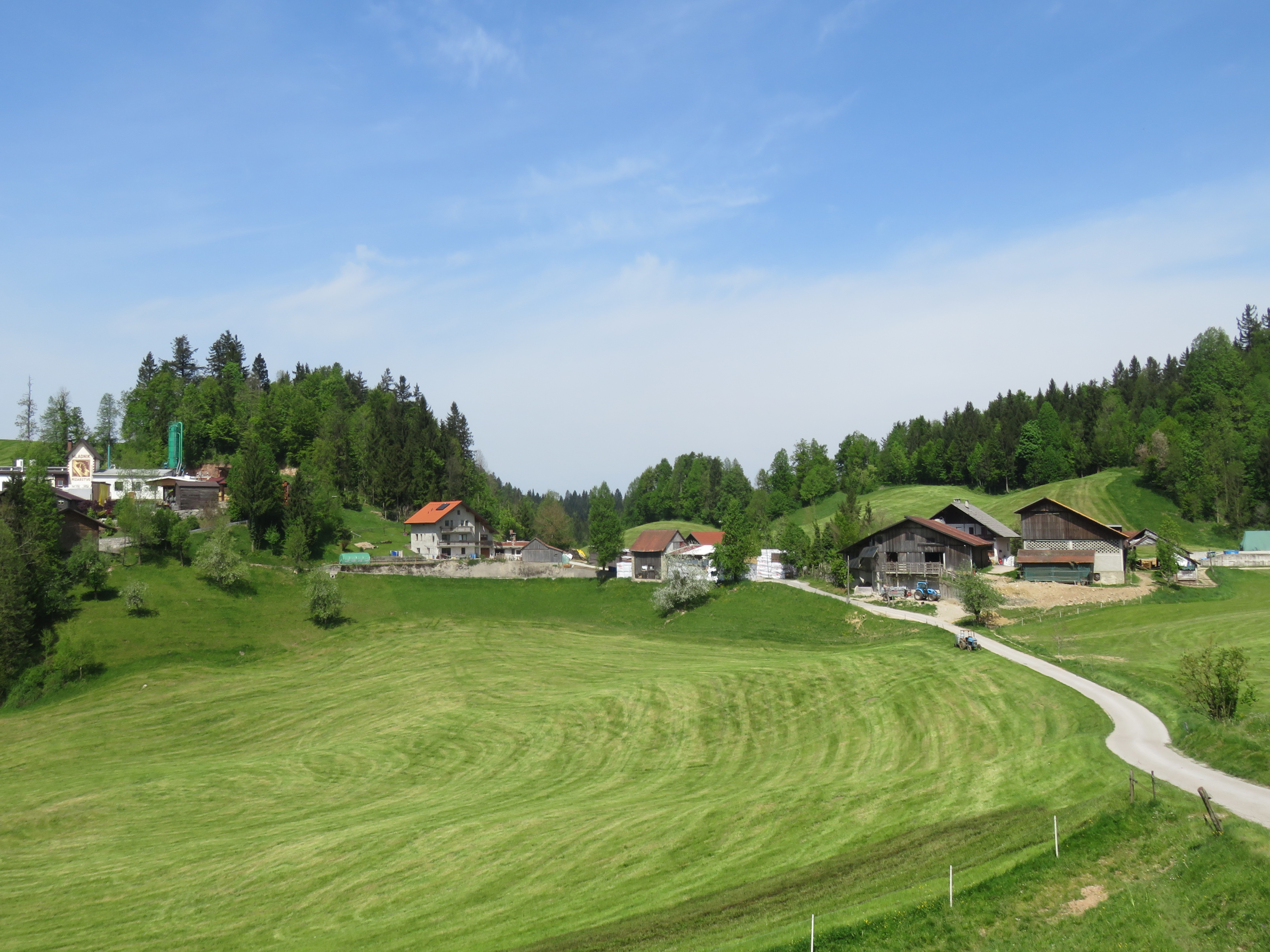

- Location in Slovenia
- Coordinates: 45°58′13.15″N 14°12′6.8″E
- Country: Slovenia
- Traditional region: Inner Carniola
- Statistical region: Central Slovenia
- Municipality: Logatec

Area
  - Total: 7.62 km^{2} (2.94 sq mi)
- Elevation: 687.7 m (2,256 ft)

Population (2002)
  - Total: 384

Petkovec (pronounced [pɛˈtkɔːʋəts] or [pɛˈtkoːʋəts], German: Petkouz) is a dispersed settlement in the hills north of Logatec in the Inner Carniola region of Slovenia.

== Church ==
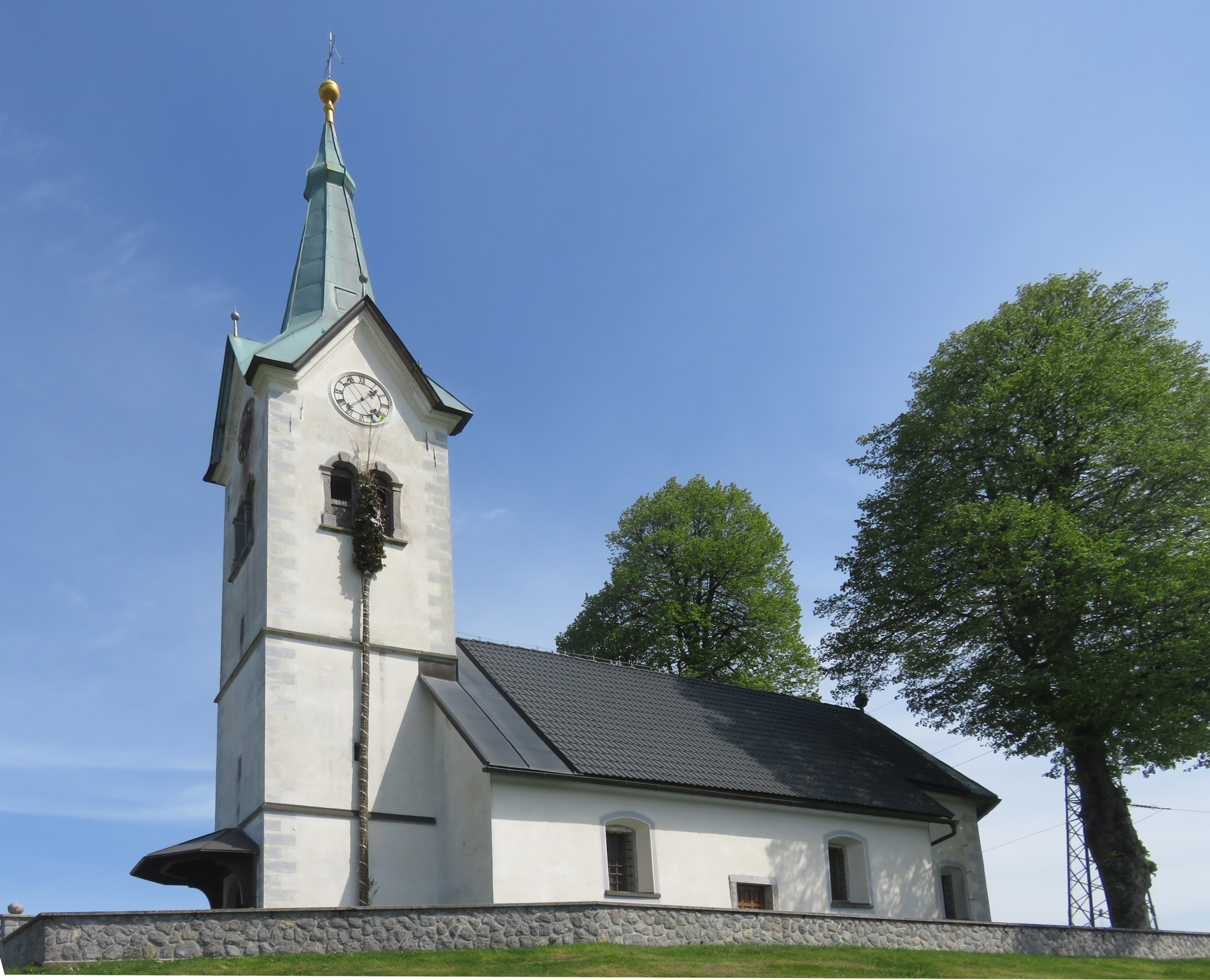
Saint Jerome's Church

The local church is dedicated to Saint Jerome and belongs to the Parish of Rovte. It was first mentioned in written documents dating to 1526 and was rebuilt in the Baroque style in 1721.
