= Praprotno Brdo =

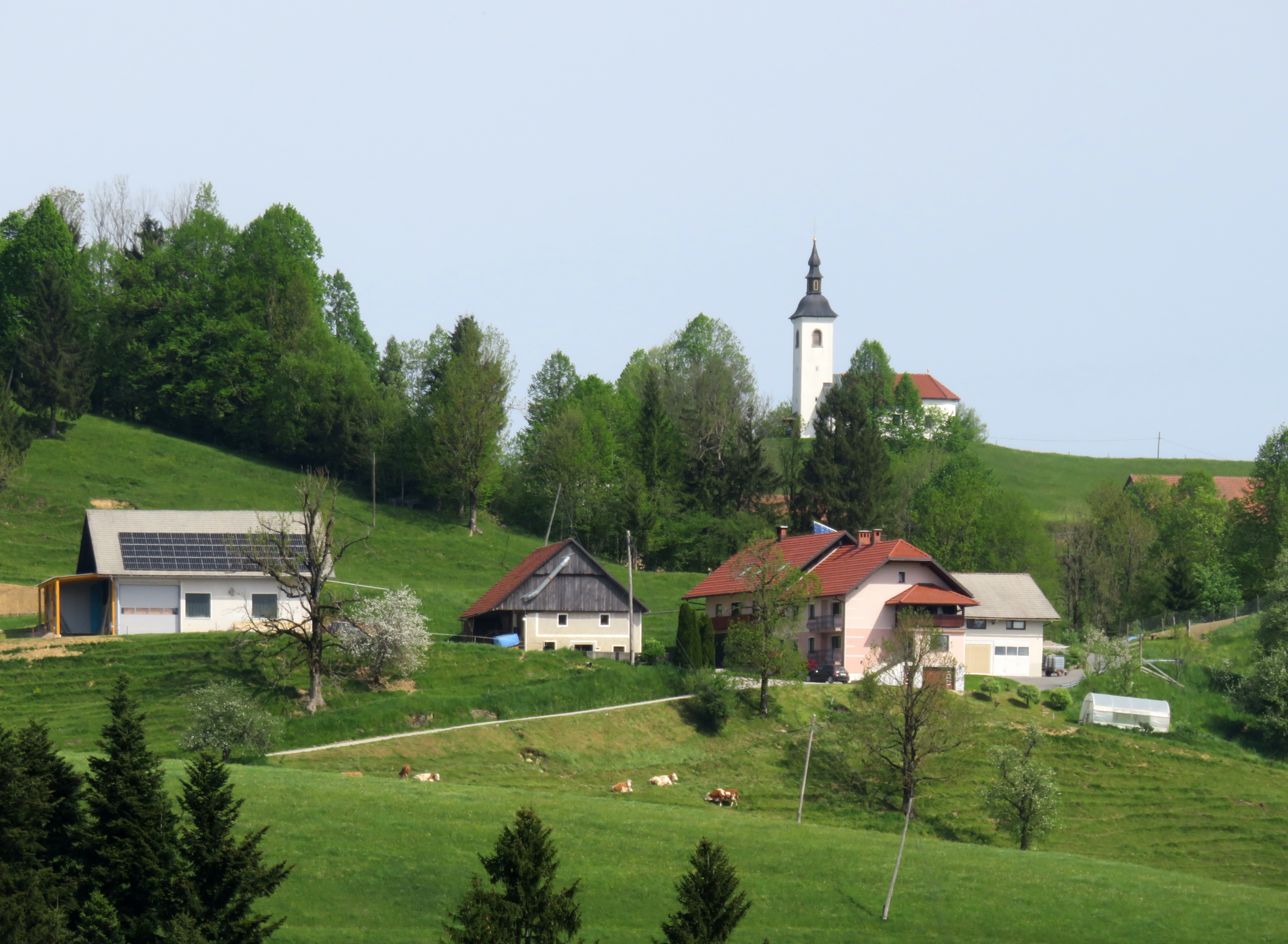

- Location in Slovenia
- Coordinates: 45°59′56.31″N 14°10′57″E
- Country: Slovenia
- Traditional region: Inner Carniola
- Statistical region: Central Slovenia
- Municipality: Logatec

Area
  - Total: 2.46 km^{2} (0.95 sq mi)
- Elevation: 699.1 m (2,294 ft)

Population (2002)
  - Total: 36

Praprotno Brdo (pronounced [ˈpɾaːpɾɔtnɔ ˈbəɾdɔ]) is a small settlement above Rovte in the Municipality of Logatec in the Inner Carniola region of Slovenia.

== Church ==
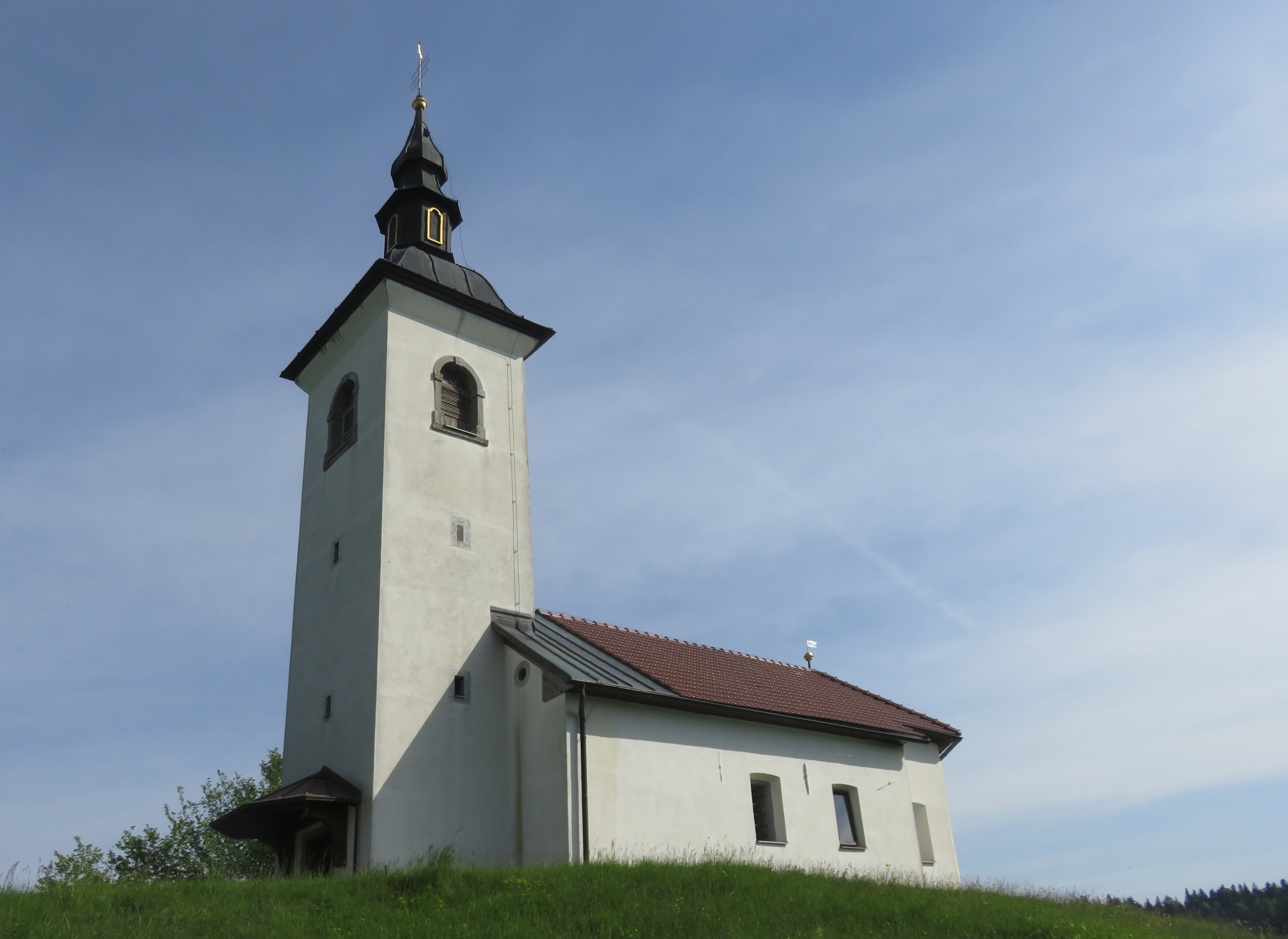
Saint Nicholas's Church

The local church is dedicated to Saint Nicholas and belongs to the Parish of Rovte.
