= Municipality of Logatec =

Municipality of Slovenia

Municipality of Logatec Občina Logatec
- Municipality
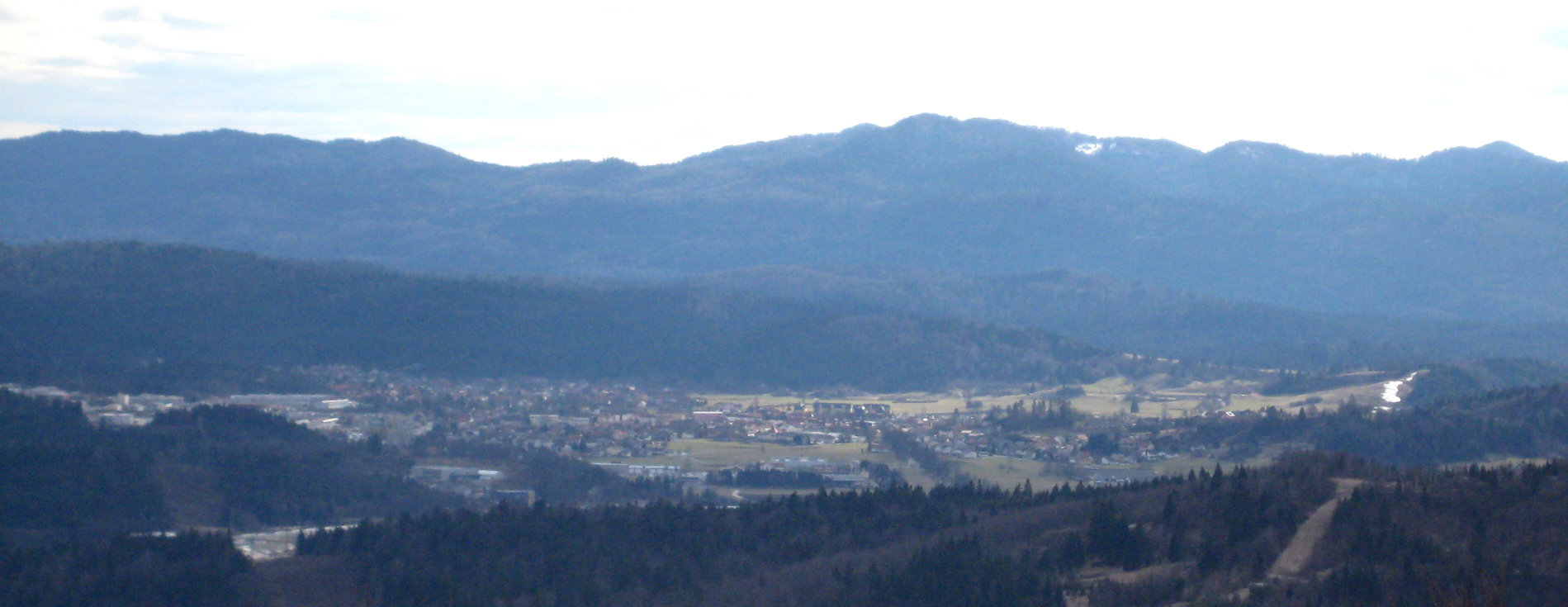

- Location of the Logatec Municipality in Slovenia
- Coordinates: 45°55′N 14°14′E
- Country: Slovenia

Government
  - Mayor: Berto Menard (Independent)

Area
  - Total: 173.1 km^{2} (66.8 sq mi)

Population (2002)
  - Total: 11,343
  - Density: 65.53/km^{2} (169.7/sq mi)
- Time zone: UTC+01 (CET)
  - Summer (DST): UTC+02 (CEST)

The Municipality of Logatec (pronounced [lɔˈɡaːtəts]; Slovene: Občina Logatec) is a municipality in Slovenia. The administrative seat of the municipality is the town of Logatec. It is located roughly in the centre of Inner Carniola, between the capital Ljubljana and Postojna. The area is mostly covered by forests and is known for biking and hiking routes.

== Settlements ==
In addition to the municipal seat of Logatec, the municipality also includes the following settlements:

- Grčarevec
- Hleviše
- Hlevni Vrh
- Hotedršica
- Jakovica
- Kalce
- Lavrovec
- Laze
- Medvedje Brdo
- Novi Svet
- Petkovec
- Praprotno Brdo
- Ravnik pri Hotedršici
- Rovtarske Žibrše
- Rovte
- Vrh Svetih Treh Kraljev
- Zaplana
- Žibrše
