= Lavrovec =

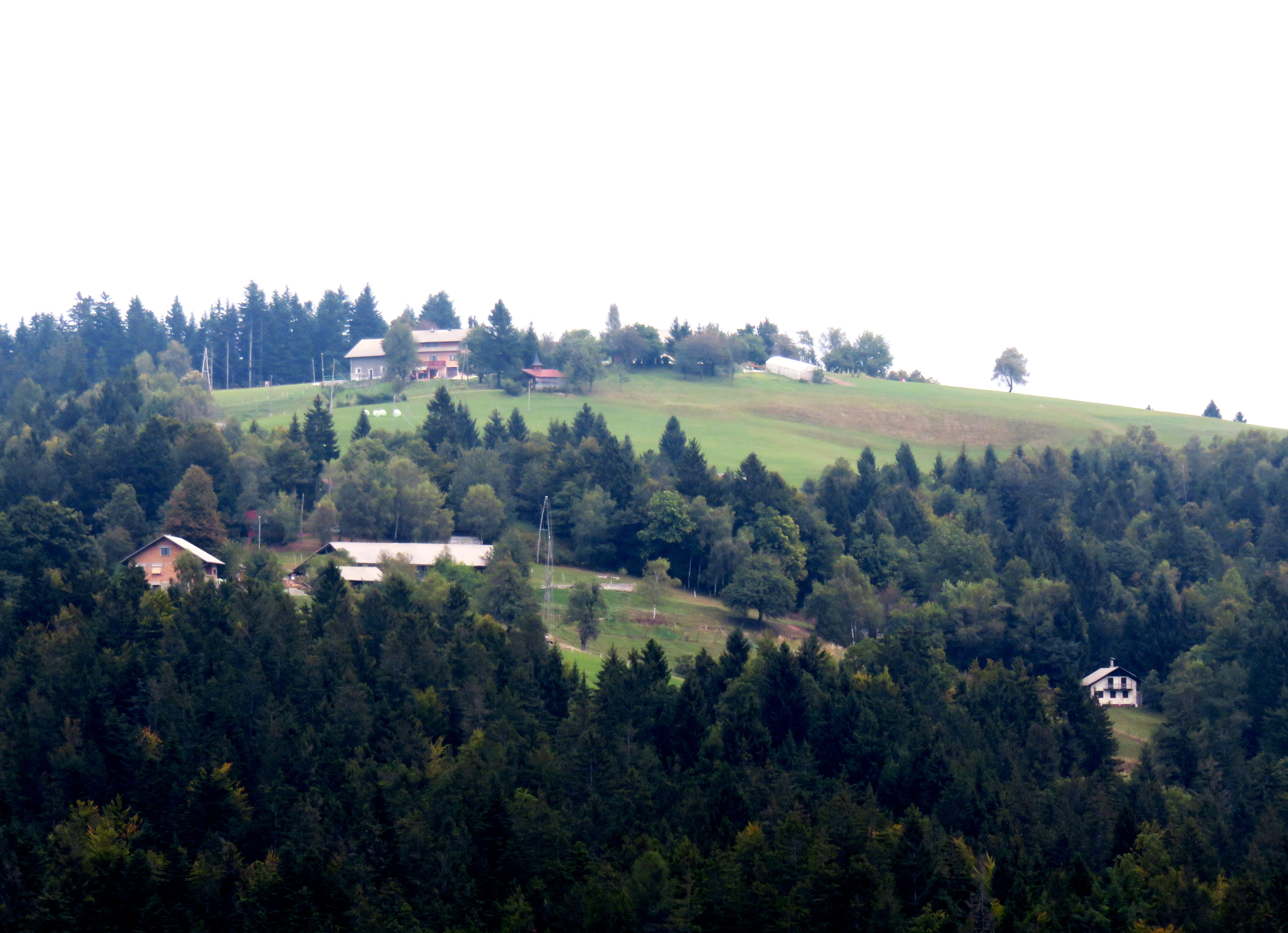

- Location in Slovenia
- Coordinates: 46°1′24.51″N 14°11′9.65″E
- Country: Slovenia
- Traditional region: Inner Carniola
- Statistical region: Central Slovenia
- Municipality: Logatec

Area
  - Total: 2.16 km^{2} (0.83 sq mi)
- Elevation: 889 m (2,917 ft)

Population (2002)
  - Total: 113

Lavrovec (pronounced [ˈlaːu̯ɾɔʋəts]) is a small dispersed settlement in the hills southeast of Žiri in Slovenia. It lies in the Municipality of Logatec in the Inner Carniola region.
