= Laze, Logatec =

Laze
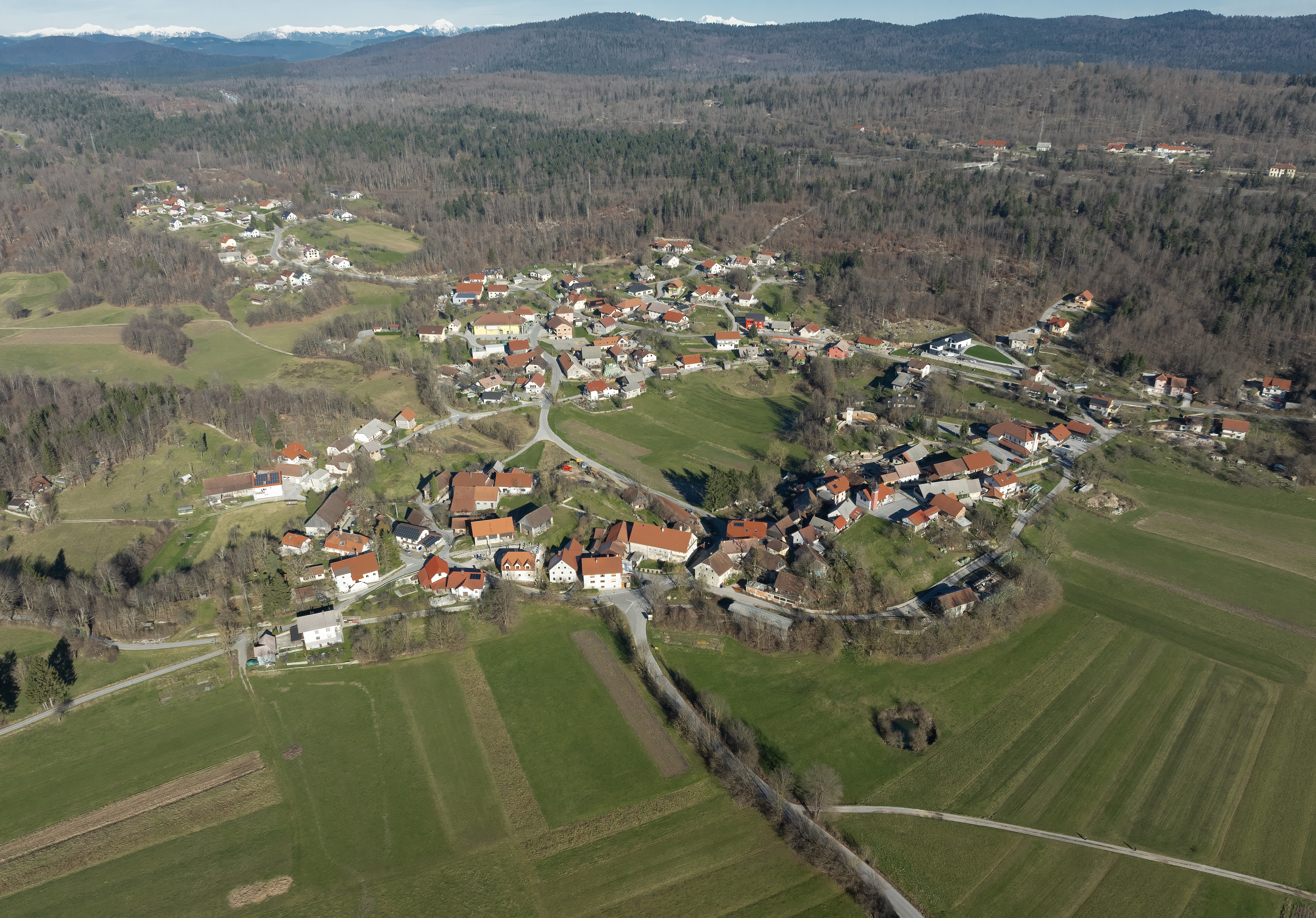

- Location in Slovenia
- Coordinates: 45°51′31.7″N 14°15′53.21″E
- Country: Slovenia
- Traditional region: Inner Carniola
- Statistical region: Central Slovenia
- Municipality: Logatec

Area
  - Total: 11.56 km^{2} (4.46 sq mi)
- Elevation: 453.5 m (1,488 ft)

Population (2002)
  - Total: 299

Laze (pronounced [ˈlaːzɛ], German: Lase) is a village south of Logatec in the Inner Carniola region of Slovenia.

== Name ==
The name Laze was originally an accusative plural of the masculine common noun laz 'grassy clearing', referring to a local landscape element. It was later reanalyzed as a feminine nominative plural. The settlement was known as Lase in German.

== Clandestine grave ==
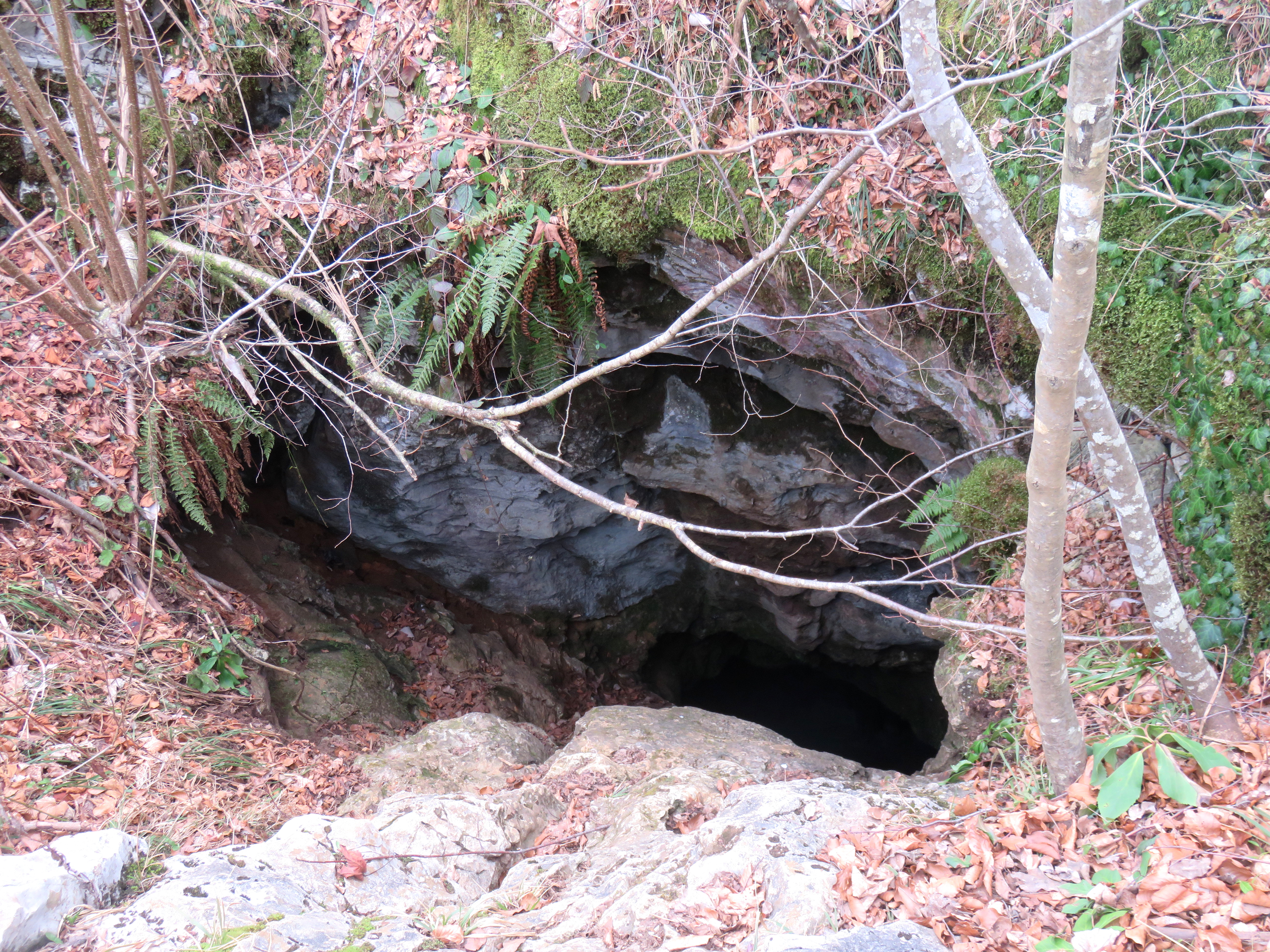
The Logarček Shaft Grave

Laze is the site of a clandestine grave from the period after the Second World War. The Logarček Shaft Grave (Slovene: Grobišče Brezno Logarček) is located in the woods between Laze and the freeway, about 320 meters (1,050 ft) northwest of the overpass. It contained the remains of a Slovene civilian victim of the December 1945 postwar killings. The remains were removed from the grave under unknown circumstances.
