= Medvedje Brdo =

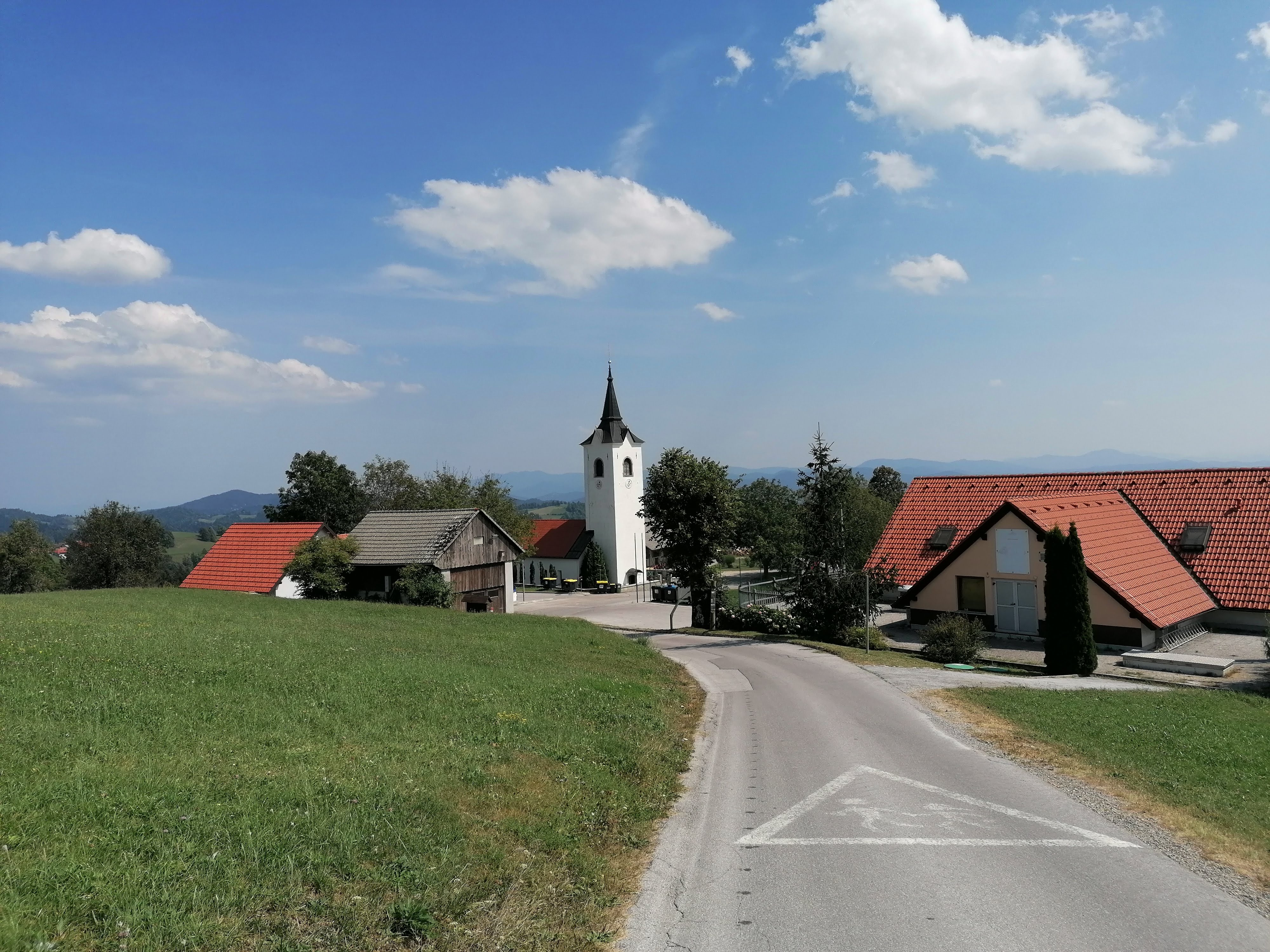

- Location in Slovenia
- Coordinates: 45°58′4.98″N 14°8′13.26″E
- Country: Slovenia
- Traditional region: Inner Carniola
- Statistical region: Central Slovenia
- Municipality: Logatec

Area
  - Total: 9.58 km^{2} (3.70 sq mi)
- Elevation: 806 m (2,644 ft)

Population (2002)
  - Total: 203

Medvedje Brdo (pronounced [mɛˈdʋeːdjɛ ˈbəɾdɔ], German: Medwedjeberdo) is a dispersed settlement in the Rovte Hills northwest of Logatec in the Inner Carniola region of Slovenia.

== Name ==
Medvedje Brdo was attested in historical documents as S. Kathrein in 1496, referring to Saint Catherine's Church in the village. The name Medvedje Brdo literally means 'bear hill', but like similar place names (e.g., Medvedjek, Medvedje selo, Medvedce) it may be derived from an animal-based surname rather than directly from the zoonym itself.

== Church ==
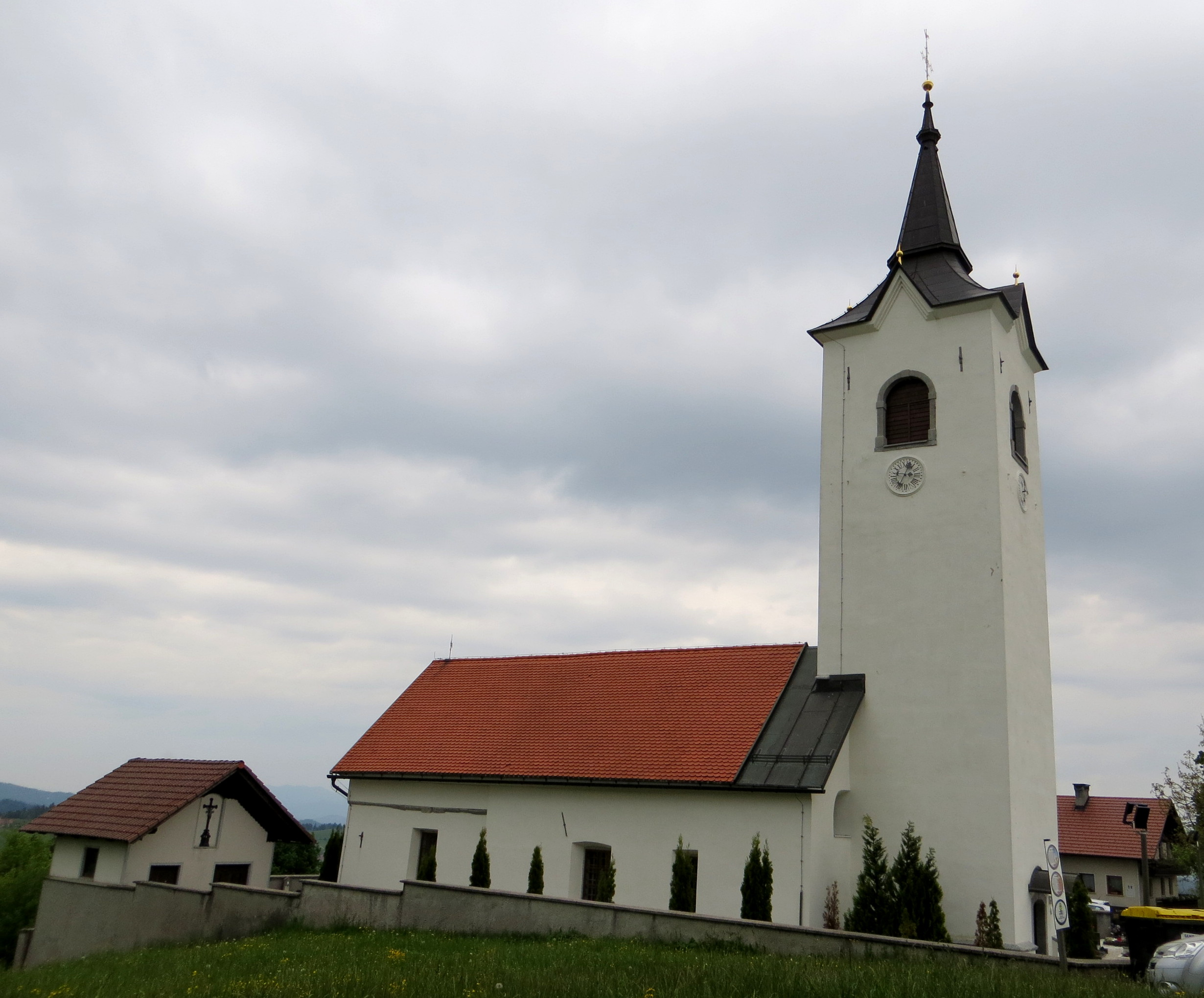
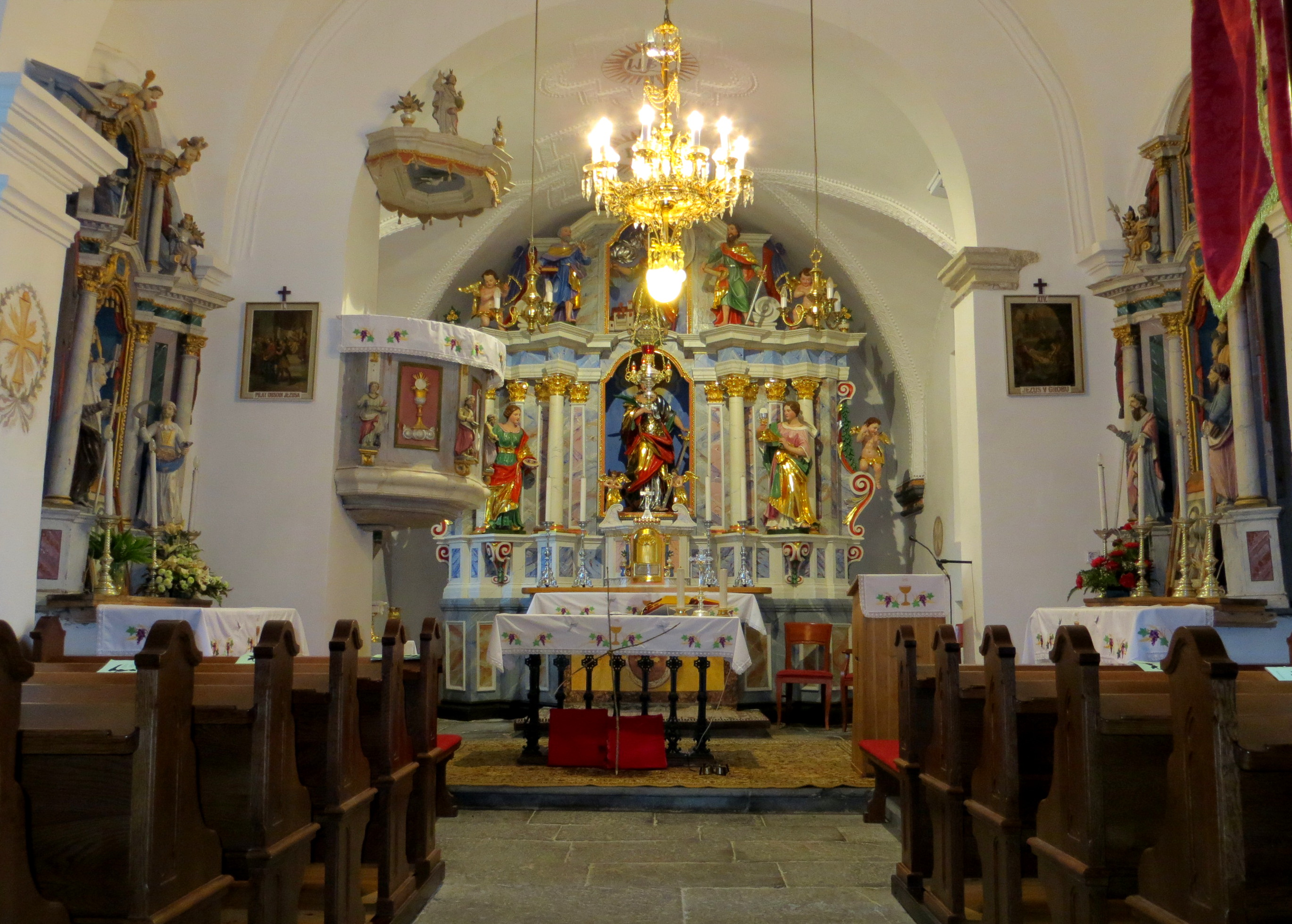
Saint Catherine's Church exterior (left) and chancel (right)

The local church in the settlement is dedicated to Saint Catherine and belongs to the Parish of Zavratec.
