= Hotedršica =

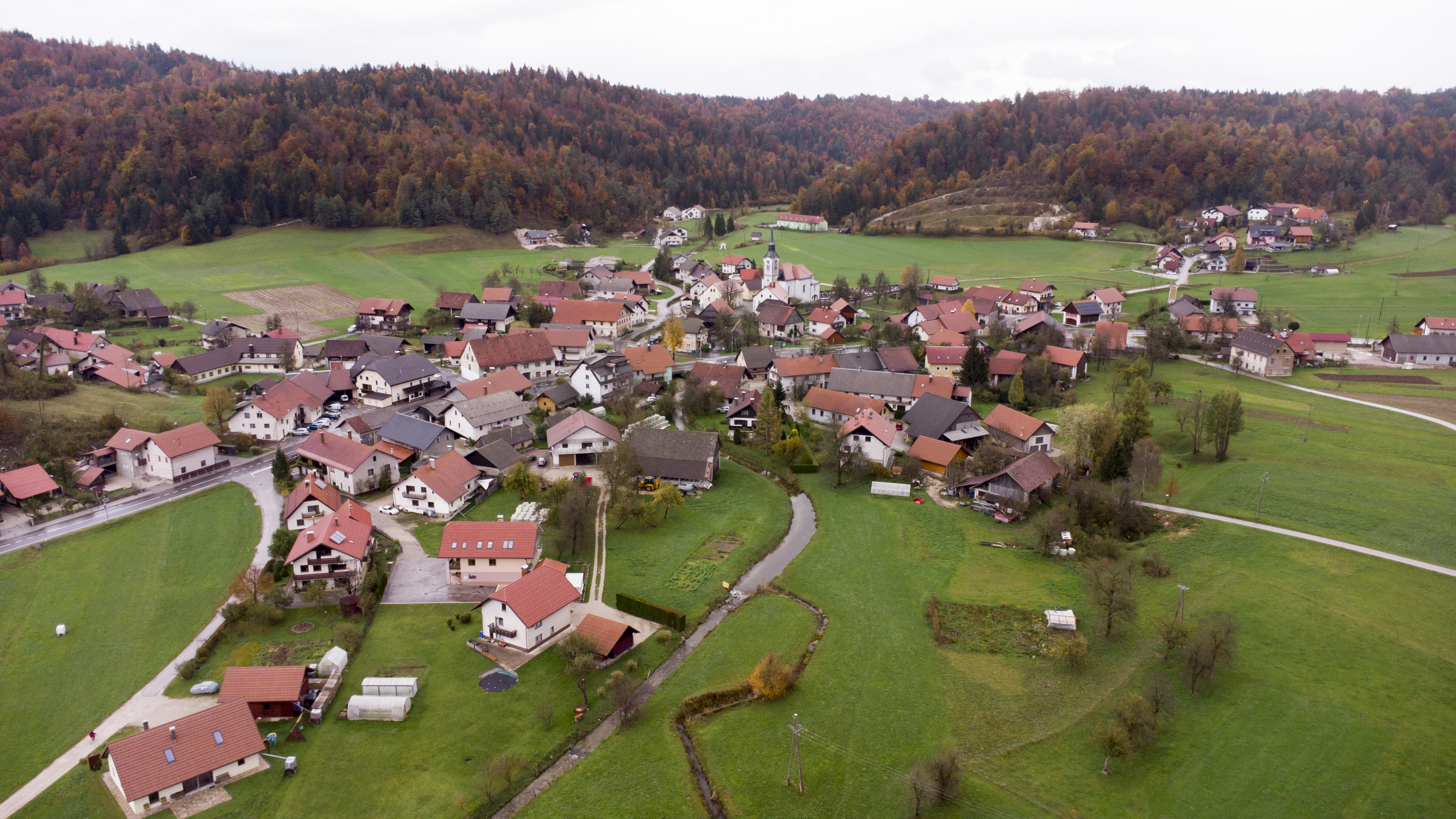

- Location in Slovenia
- Coordinates: 45°55′50.29″N 14°8′21.38″E
- Country: Slovenia
- Traditional region: Inner Carniola
- Statistical region: Central Slovenia
- Municipality: Logatec

Area
  - Total: 3.99 km^{2} (1.54 sq mi)
- Elevation: 544.9 m (1,788 ft)

Population (2002)
  - Total: 554

Hotedršica (pronounced [xɔˈteːdəɾʃitsa], in older sources Hotedražica, German: Hotederschitz) is a village west of Logatec in the Inner Carniola region of Slovenia.

== Geography ==
Hotedršica includes the hamlets of Griče (in older sources: V Gričih, German: Am Hügel) to the north, Koš to the east, and Čajna and Log to the south. Hotedršica lies in the middle of the Hotedršica Lowland (Slovene: Hotenjsko podolje), a low-lying area extending toward Kalce to the southeast and Godovič to the northwest with karst springs and sinkholes in the surrounding foothills.

== Name ==
Hotedršica was first attested in written sources in 1421 as Kathedresicz (and in 1496 as Kathedersicz). The name is a syncopated form of *Hotedražica, derived from the personal name *Xotědragъ (from *xotěti 'to desire' + *dorgъ 'good').

== Church ==
The parish church in the settlement is dedicated to John the Baptist and belongs to the Ljubljana Archdiocese.
