= Hleviše =

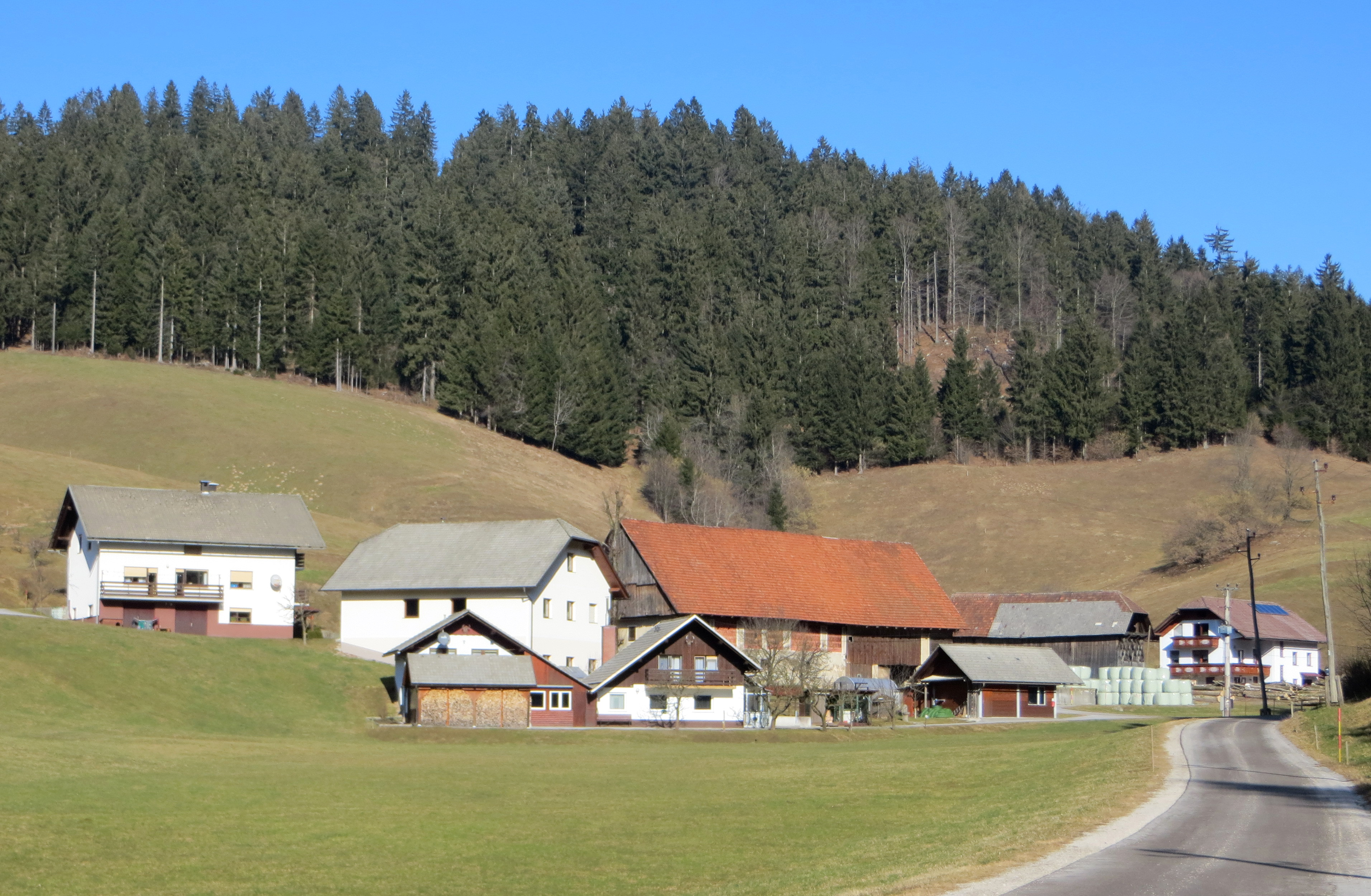

- Location in Slovenia
- Coordinates: 46°0′26.26″N 14°9′3.6″E
- Country: Slovenia
- Traditional region: Inner Carniola
- Statistical region: Central Slovenia
- Municipality: Logatec

Area
  - Total: 2.57 km^{2} (0.99 sq mi)
- Elevation: 616.9 m (2,024 ft)

Population (2002)
  - Total: 63

Hleviše (pronounced [xlɛˈʋiːʃɛ], German: Hlewische) is a small dispersed settlement in the hills north of Logatec in the Inner Carniola region of Slovenia.

== Gallery ==
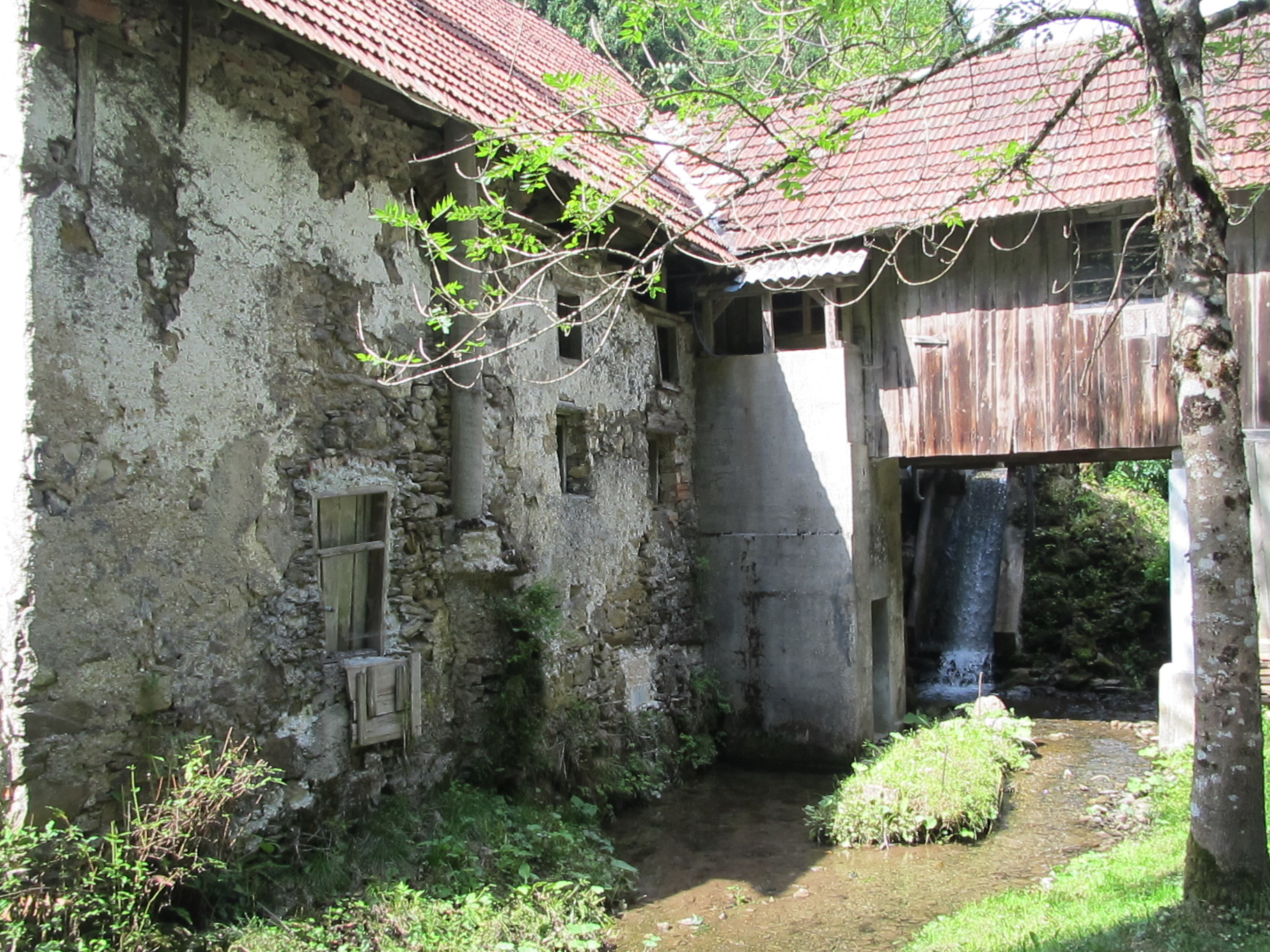
The Rodof Mill in the valley of Sovra Creek
