= Zaplana, Logatec =

Zaplana
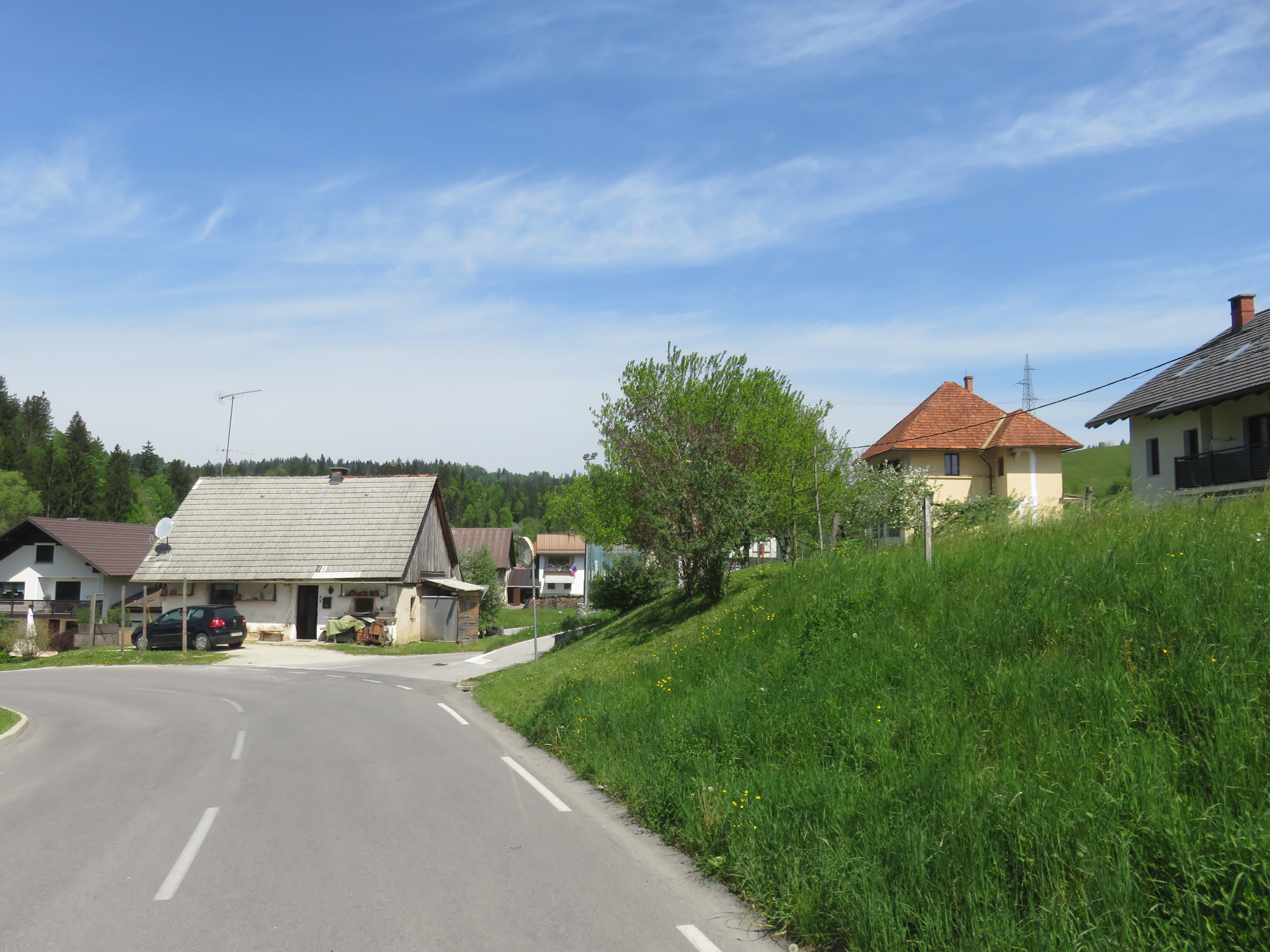

- Location in Slovenia
- Coordinates: 45°57′5.31″N 14°12′33.31″E
- Country: Slovenia
- Traditional region: Inner Carniola
- Statistical region: Central Slovenia
- Municipality: Logatec

Area
  - Total: 1.72 km^{2} (0.66 sq mi)
- Elevation: 520.8 m (1,709 ft)

Population (2002)
  - Total: 66

Zaplana (pronounced [zaˈplaːna]) is a dispersed settlement in the Municipality of Logatec in the Inner Carniola region of Slovenia. It lies in the hills to the north of the town of Logatec. It is sometimes considered part of Zaplana in the Municipality of Vrhnika although it is separated from it by a hill, not in continuous territory with it, and in a different municipality.

== Name ==
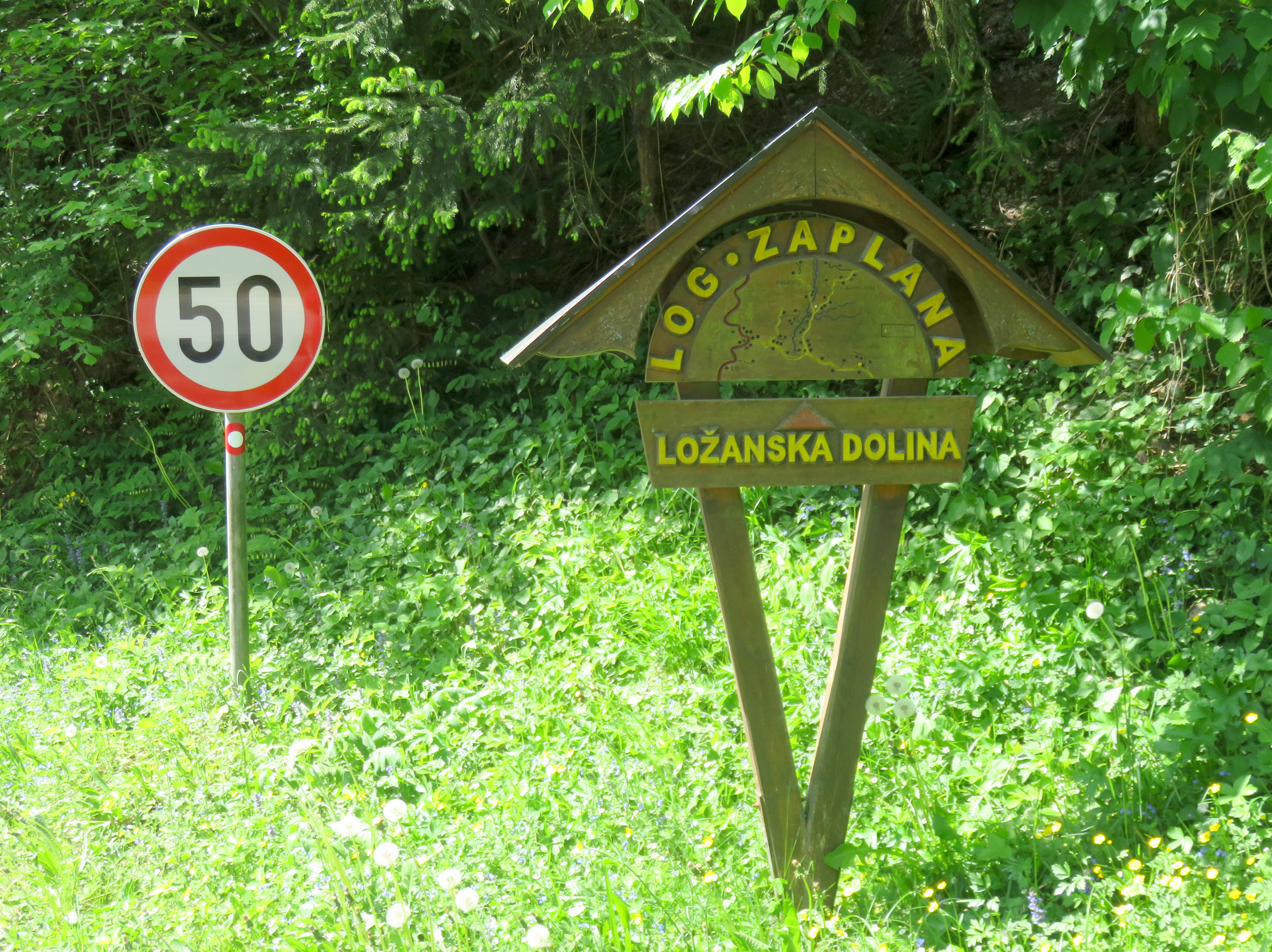
Sign for Zaplana

The name Zaplana has been explained as a fused prepositional phrase that has lost case inflection, from za 'behind' + planja or planjava 'plateau, plain, open country', thus 'place beyond a plateau or open country'. Because the main hamlet of the settlement is named Log, it has been proposed that the settlement be renamed Log pri Logatcu (i.e., 'Log near Logatec') to avoid confusion with the settlement of Zaplana in the Municipality of Vrhnika.
