= Kalce, Logatec =

Kalce
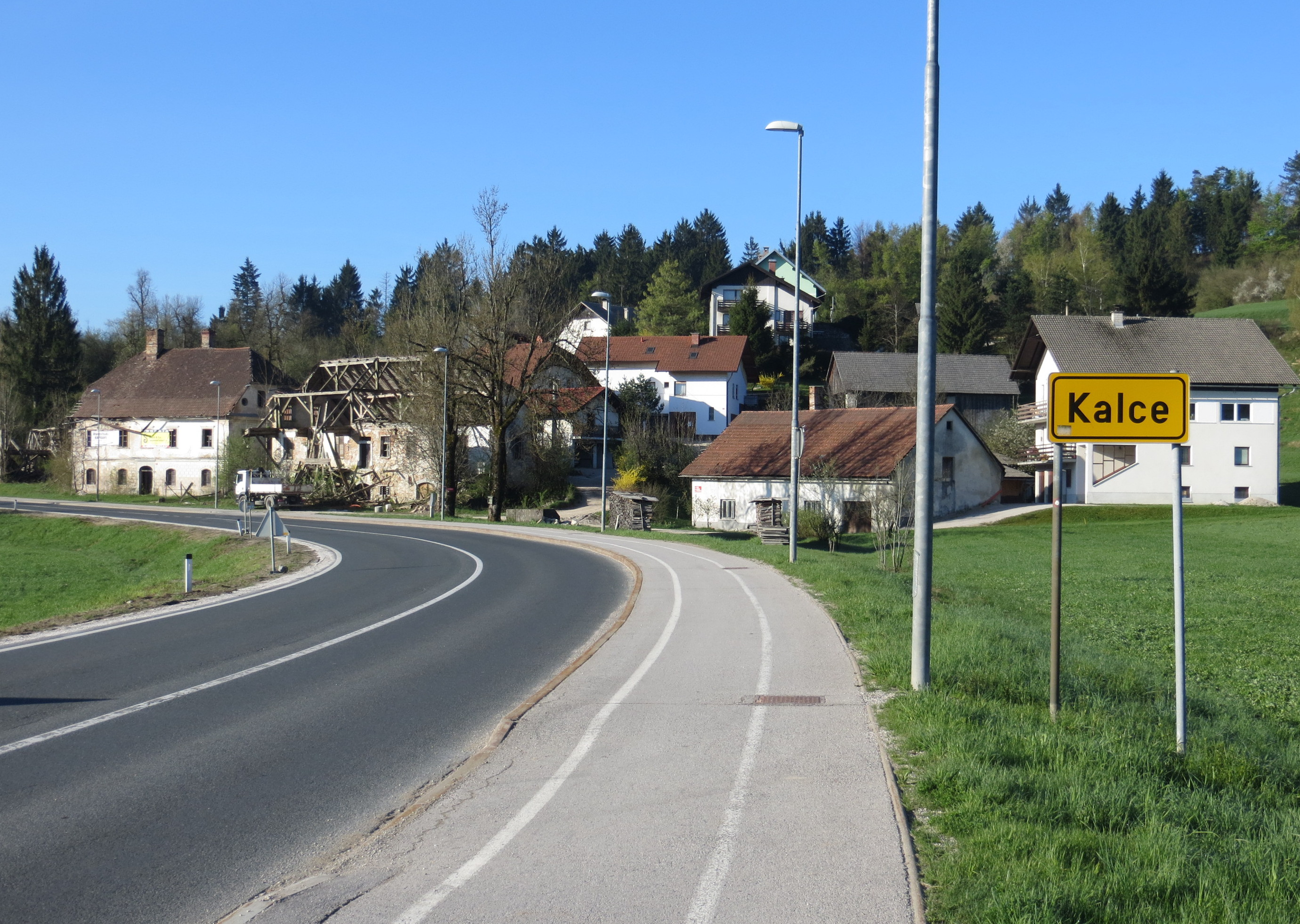

- Location in Slovenia
- Coordinates: 45°53′41.4″N 14°11′23.37″E
- Country: Slovenia
- Traditional region: Inner Carniola
- Statistical region: Central Slovenia
- Municipality: Logatec

Area
  - Total: 15.24 km^{2} (5.88 sq mi)
- Elevation: 490.9 m (1,611 ft)

Population (2002)
  - Total: 320

Kalce (pronounced [ˈkau̯ːtsɛ], German: Kauze) is a settlement southwest of Logatec in the Inner Carniola region of Slovenia.

== Geography ==
Kalce includes the hamlets of Grčarevski Vrh (German: Gartschareuzer Anhöhe) to the southeast and Gruden to the west.

== Name ==
Kalce was attested in historical sources in 1499 as Kalecz. Today's name is an accusative plural of Kalec, reanalyzed as a feminine nominative plural. It is derived from *kalьcь, a diminutive of *kalъ 'mud, pond, cloudy water', referring to a local geographical feature.

== Cultural heritage ==
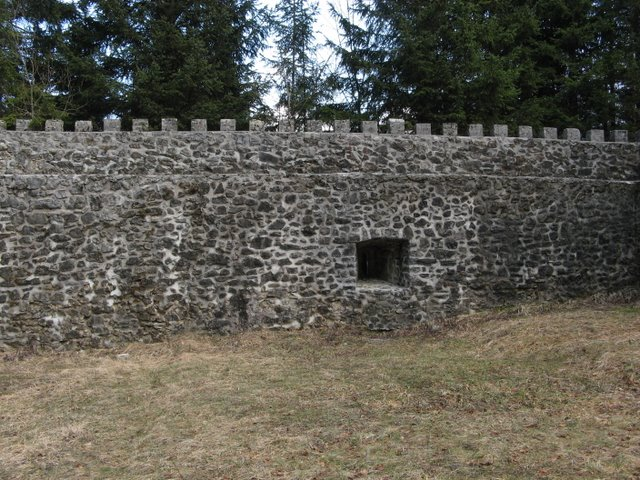
Reconstruction of the Roman fortress in Kalce

Near the village is the Lanišče Roman fortress, a restored part of the Roman Claustra Alpium Iuliarum system of northern defence walls and fortresses. Archaeological excavations in the 1960s determined that it was in use in the late 4th century AD and was probably destroyed during the war between Magnus Maximus and Theodosius in 388.

== Mass grave ==
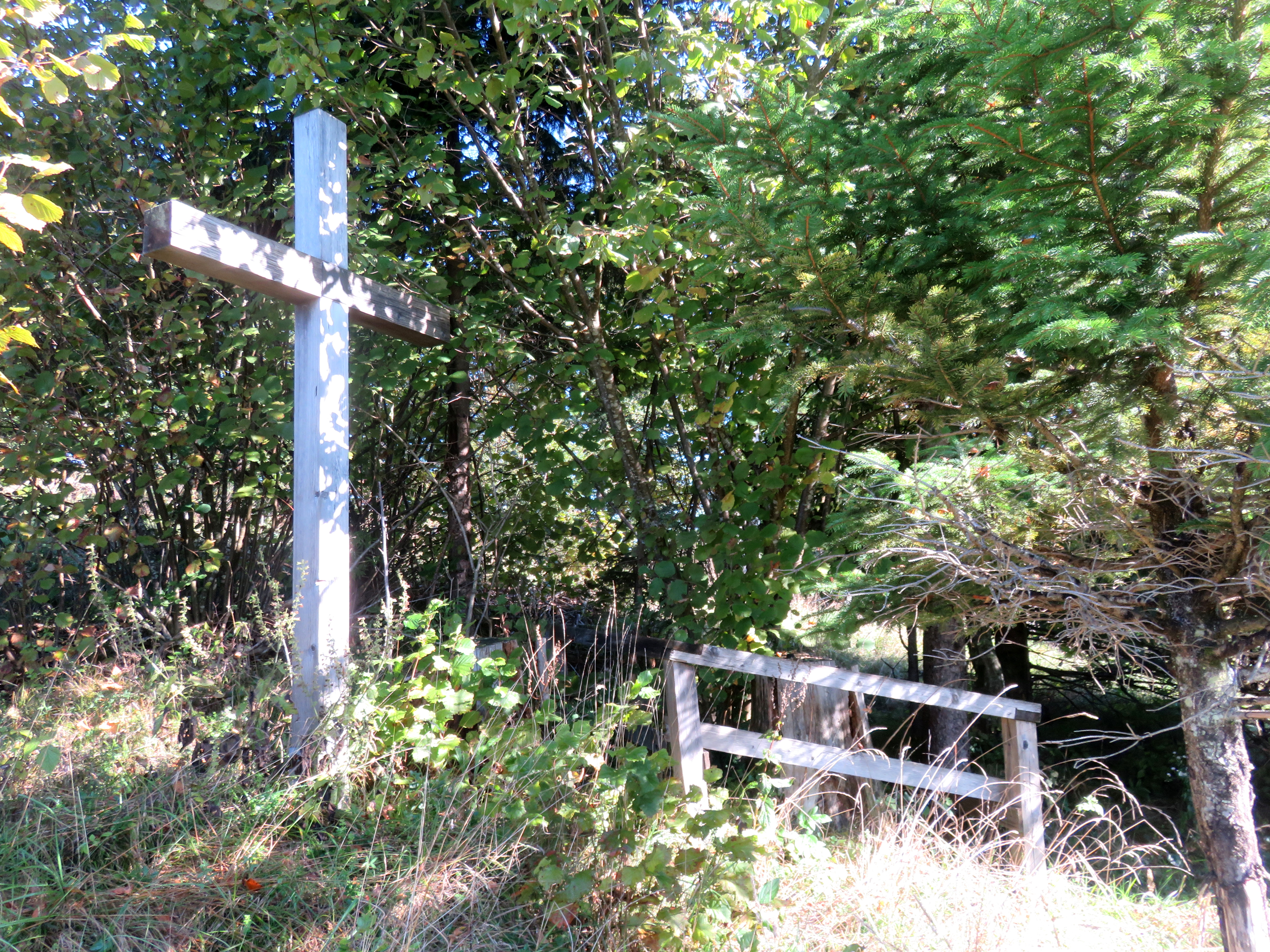
The Repiše Shaft Mass Grave

Kalce is the site of a mass grave associated with the Second World War. The Repiše Shaft Mass Grave (Slovene: Grobišče Brezno na Repišah) is located in a shaft with a small entrance southeast of the settlement. The remains of two unknown victims were discovered in the shaft, covered by a large amount of rock that had been thrown in.

== Church ==
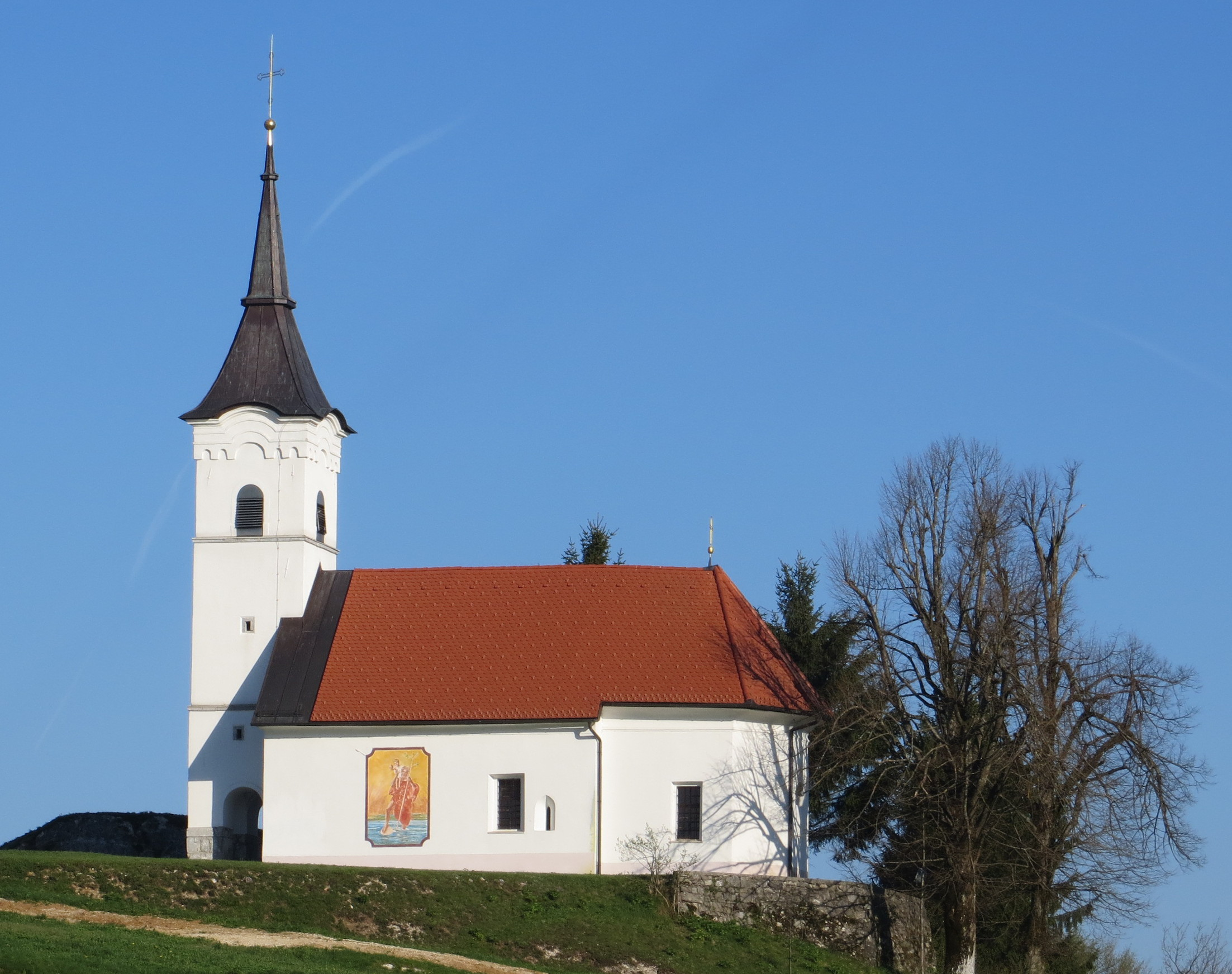
Saint John the Evangelist Church

The church in Kalce is dedicated to John the Evangelist. It was first mentioned in written records in 1526. There is a fresco depicting Saint Christopher on the exterior south wall.
