= Rovte, Logatec =

Rovte
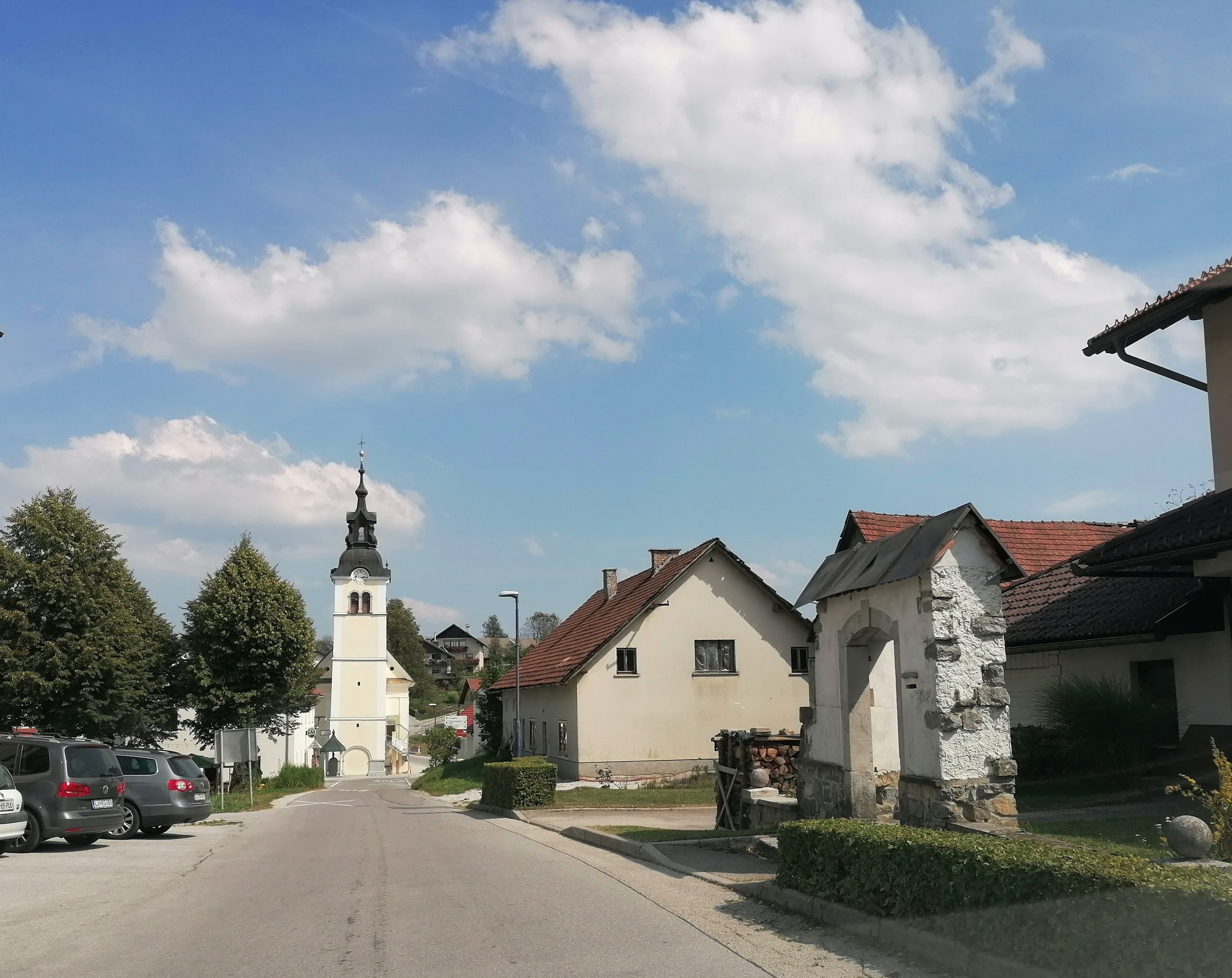

- Location in Slovenia
- Coordinates: 45°59′8.58″N 14°10′40.51″E
- Country: Slovenia
- Traditional region: Inner Carniola
- Statistical region: Central Slovenia
- Municipality: Logatec

Area
  - Total: 14.5 km^{2} (5.6 sq mi)
- Elevation: 694.2 m (2,278 ft)

Population (2002)
  - Total: 831

Rovte (pronounced [ˈɾoːu̯tɛ], German: Gereuth) is a settlement in the Rovte Hills north of Logatec in the Inner Carniola region of Slovenia.

== Church ==
The parish church in the settlement is dedicated to Saint Michael and belongs to the Ljubljana Archdiocese.

== Gallery ==
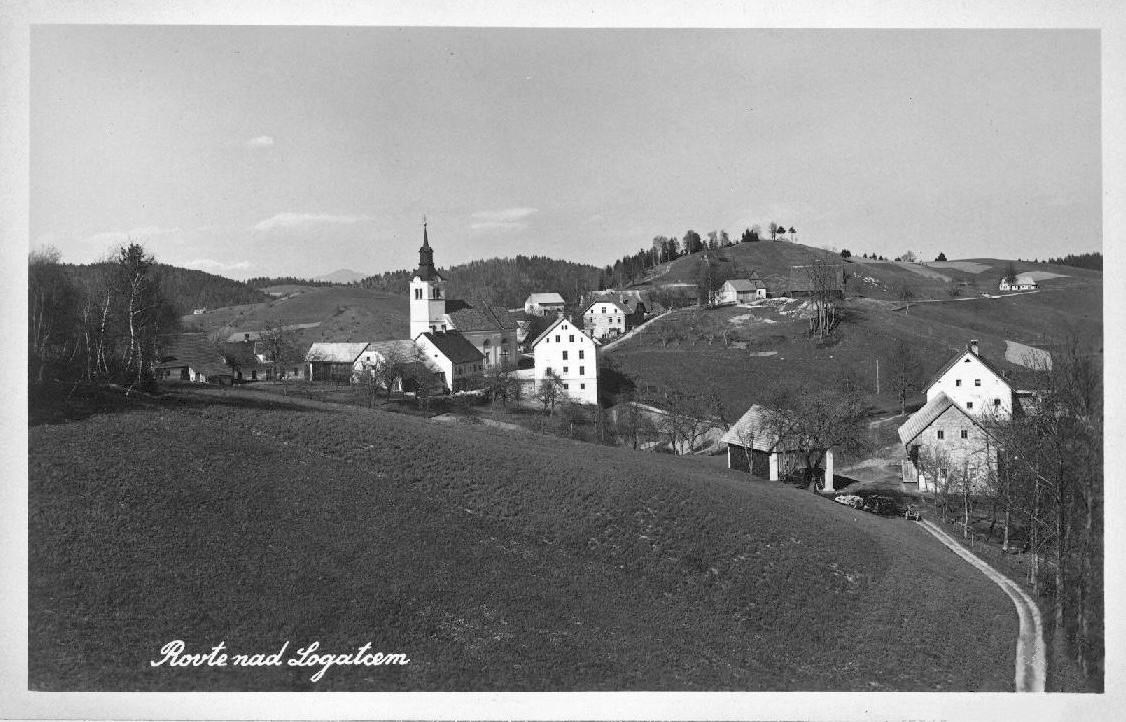
Historical postcard of Rovte
