= Logaške Žibrše =

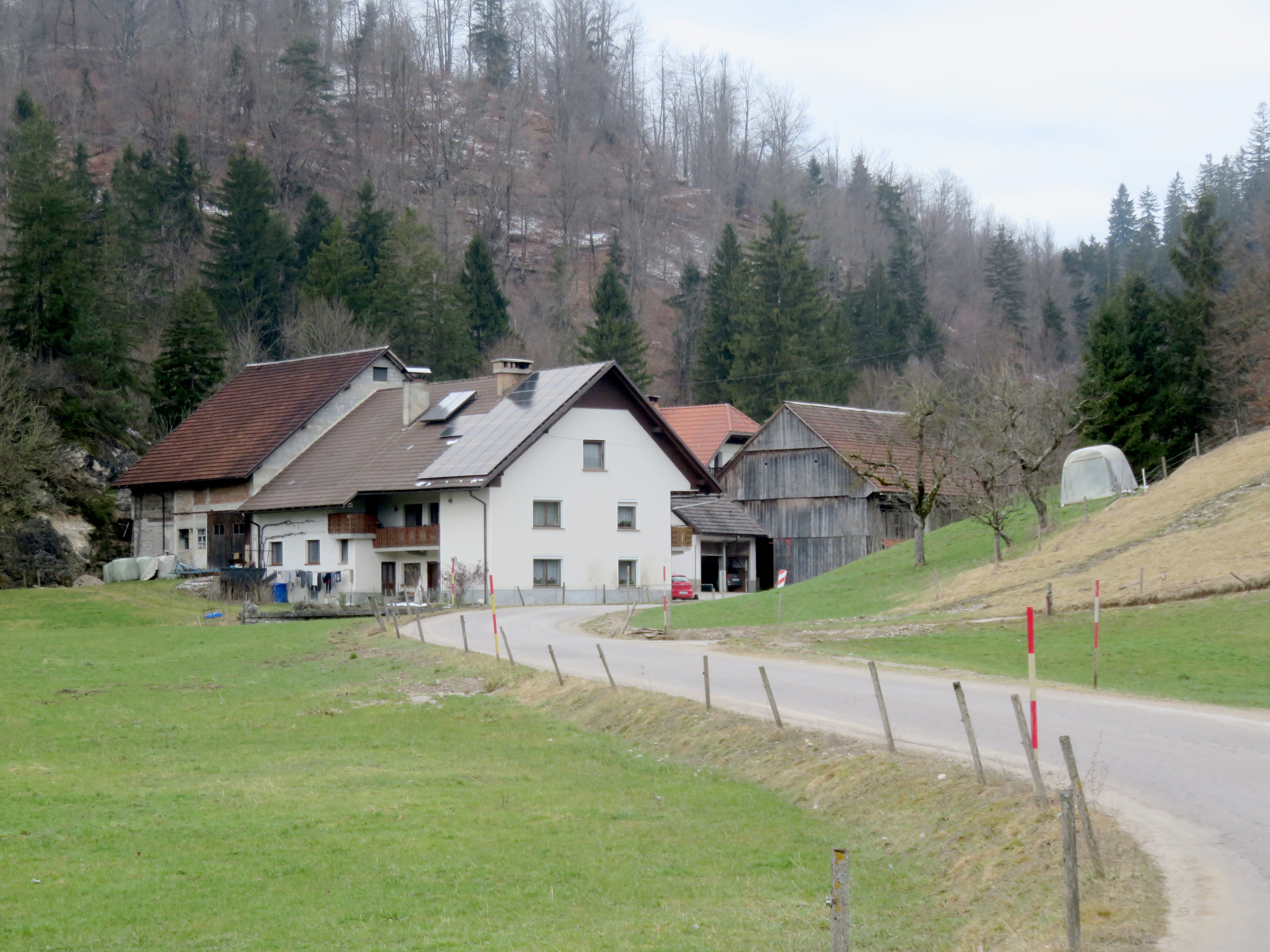

- Location in Slovenia
- Coordinates: 45°56′27″N 14°11′26″E
- Country: Slovenia
- Traditional region: Inner Carniola
- Statistical region: Central Slovenia
- Municipality: Logatec
- Elevation: 517 m (1,696 ft)

Logaške Žibrše (pronounced [lɔˈɡaːʃkɛ ˈʒiːbəɾʃɛ], in older sources Žiberše, German: Sibersche) is a former village in western Slovenia in the Municipality of Logatec. It is now part of the village of Žibrše. It is part of the traditional region of Inner Carniola and is now included in the Central Slovenia Statistical Region.

== Geography ==
Logaške Žibrše is located northwest of Logatec on the eastern edge of the village territory of Žibrše. A hill known as Šenčur Peak (Slovene: Šenčurjev vrh, elevation: 725 meters or 2,379 feet) rises west of the settlement. Reka Creek flows through the settlement. The soil is gravelly.

== Name ==
The name Logaške Žibrše means 'Žibrše in the Logatec direction'. The name Logaške Žibrše was used to distinguish the settlement from neighboring Blekovske Žibrše (i.e., 'Žibrše in the Blekova Vas direction') and Hotenjske Žibrše ('Žibrše in the Hotedršica direction'), as well as Rovtarske Žibrše ('Žibrše in the Rovte direction') to the north. The name Žibrše itself is derived from the Middle High German personal name Sîvrid 'Siegfried', referring to an early inhabitant of the place.

== History ==
Logaške Žibrše had a population of 16 (in four houses) in 1900. Together with Blekovske Žibrše and Hotenjske Žibrše, Logaške Žibrše was combined into a single village called Žibrše in 1955, ending its existence as a separate settlement.
