= Hotenjske Žibrše =

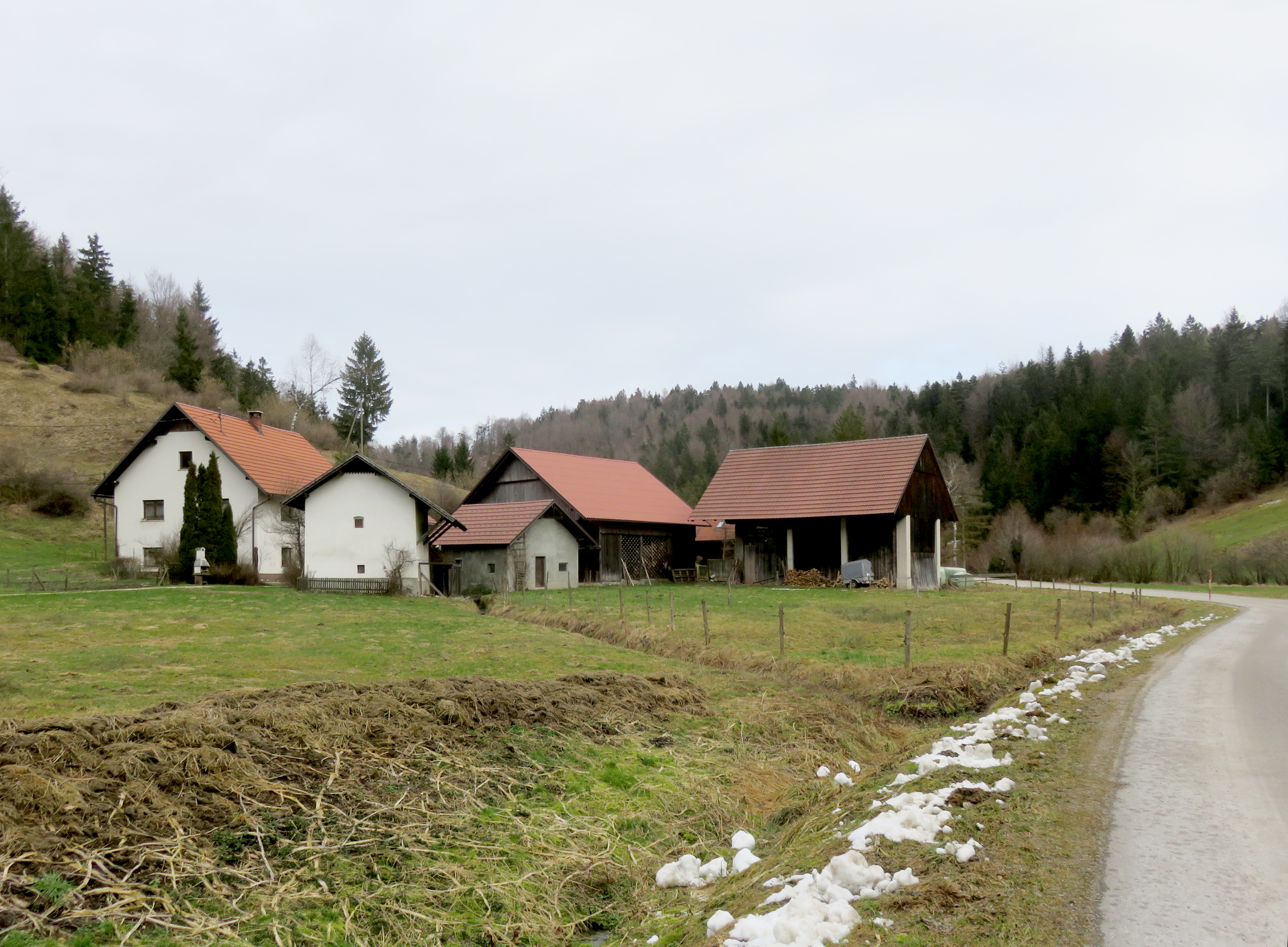

- Location in Slovenia
- Coordinates: 45°55′50″N 14°09′10″E
- Country: Slovenia
- Traditional region: Inner Carniola
- Statistical region: Central Slovenia
- Municipality: Logatec
- Elevation: 556 m (1,824 ft)

Hotenjske Žibrše (pronounced [xɔˈteːnskɛ ˈʒiːbəɾʃɛ], in older sources Žiberše, German: Sibersche) is a former village in western Slovenia in the Municipality of Logatec. It is now part of the village of Žibrše. It is part of the traditional region of Inner Carniola and is now included in the Central Slovenia Statistical Region.

== Geography ==
Hotenjske Žibrše is located immediately east of Hotedršica on the western edge of the village territory of Žibrše. Rebenice Hill (elevation: 670 meters or 2,200 feet) rises north of the settlement, and Hotenjka Creek flows through it. The soil is gravelly.

== Name ==
The name Hotenjske Žibrše means 'Žibrše in the Hotedršica direction'. The name Hotenjske Žibrše was used to distinguish the settlement from neighboring Blekovske Žibrše (i.e., 'Žibrše in the Blekova Vas direction') and Logaške Žibrše ('Žibrše in the Logatec direction'), as well as Rovtarske Žibrše ('Žibrše in the Rovte direction') to the north. The name Žibrše itself is derived from the Middle High German personal name Sîvrid 'Siegfried', referring to an early inhabitant of the place.

== History ==
Hotenjske Žibrše had a population of 23 (in four houses) in 1870, 20 (in four houses) in 1880, 22 (in four houses) in 1890, and nine (in two houses) in 1900. Together with Blekovske Žibrše and Logaške Žibrše, Hotenjske Žibrše was combined into a single village called Žibrše in 1955, ending its existence as a separate settlement.
