= Blekovske Žibrše =

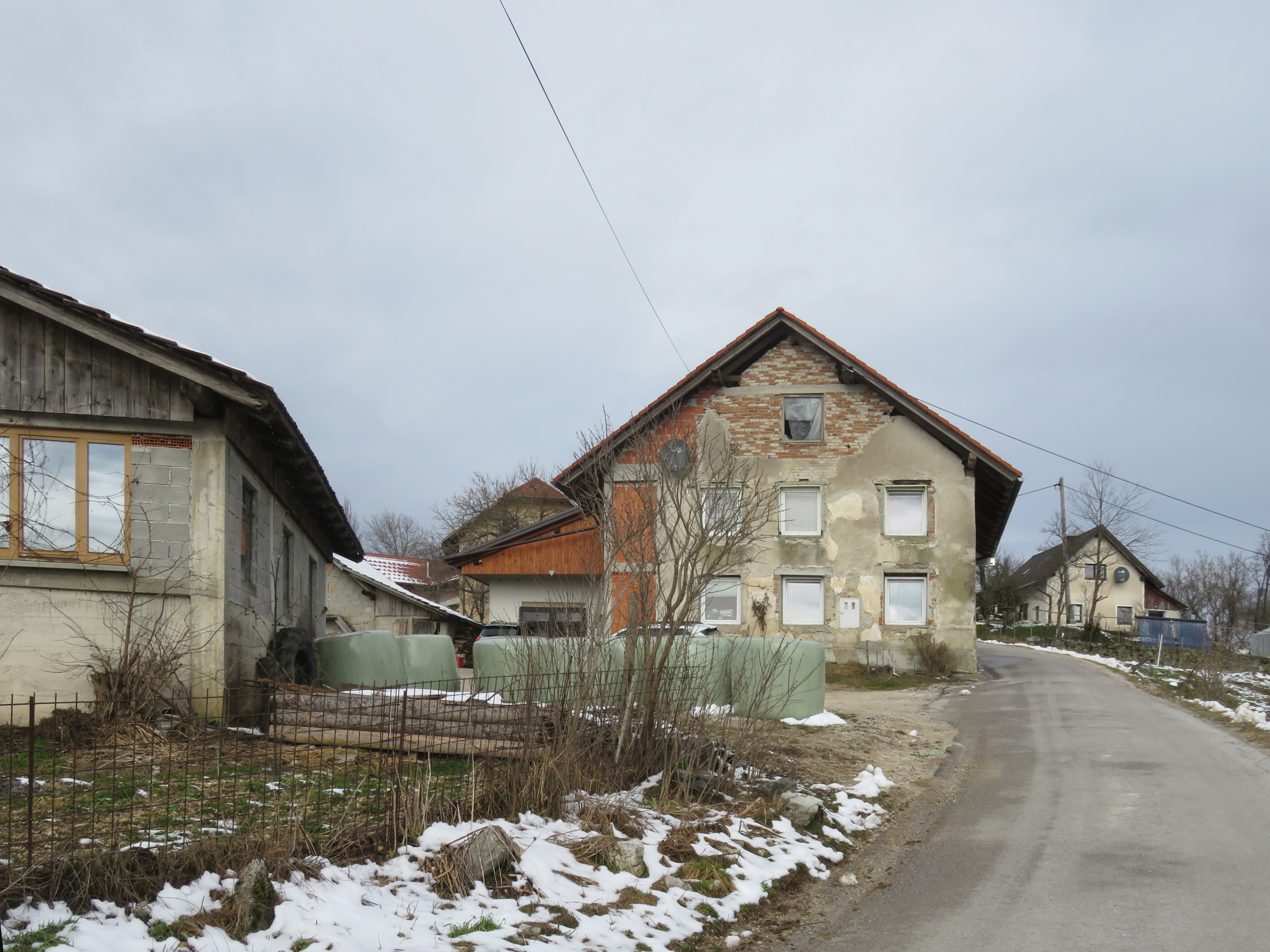

- Location in Slovenia
- Coordinates: 45°56′08″N 14°10′35″E
- Country: Slovenia
- Traditional region: Inner Carniola
- Statistical region: Central Slovenia
- Municipality: Logatec
- Elevation: 696 m (2,283 ft)

Blekovske Žibrše (pronounced [blɛˈkoːʋskɛ ˈʒiːbəɾʃɛ], in older sources Žiberše, German: Sibersche) is a former village in western Slovenia in the Municipality of Logatec. It is now part of the village of Žibrše. It is part of the traditional region of Inner Carniola and is now included in the Central Slovenia Statistical Region.

== Geography ==
Blekovske Žibrše is located northwest of Logatec in the center of the village territory of Žibrše. A hill known as Šenčur Peak (Slovene: Šenčurjev vrh, elevation: 725 meters or 2,379 feet) rises north of the settlement. Hotenjka Creek and Black Creek (Slovene: Črni potok) flow to the west, Kobal Creek (Slovene: Kobalova grapa) to the southeast, and Turk Creek (Slovene: Turkova grapa) to the northeast. The soil is gravelly.

== Name ==
The name Blekovske Žibrše means 'Žibrše in the Blekova Vas direction', referring to the former village of Blekova Vas, now part of Logatec. The name Blekovske Žibrše was used to distinguish the settlement from neighboring Hotenjske Žibrše (i.e., 'Žibrše in the Hotedršica direction') and Logaške Žibrše ('Žibrše in the Logatec direction'), as well as Rovtarske Žibrše ('Žibrše in the Rovte direction') to the north. The name Žibrše itself is derived from the Middle High German personal name Sîvrid 'Siegfried', referring to an early inhabitant of the place.

== History ==
Blekovske Žibrše had a population of three (in one house) in 1870, six (in one house) in 1880, nine (in two houses) in 1890, and 11 (in two houses) in 1900. Together with Hotenjske Žibrše and Logaške Žibrše, Blekovske Žibrše was combined into a single village called Žibrše in 1955, ending its existence as a separate settlement.
