= Gorenja Vas pod Režišami =

Gorenja Vas pod Režišami Gorenja Vas (until 1953)
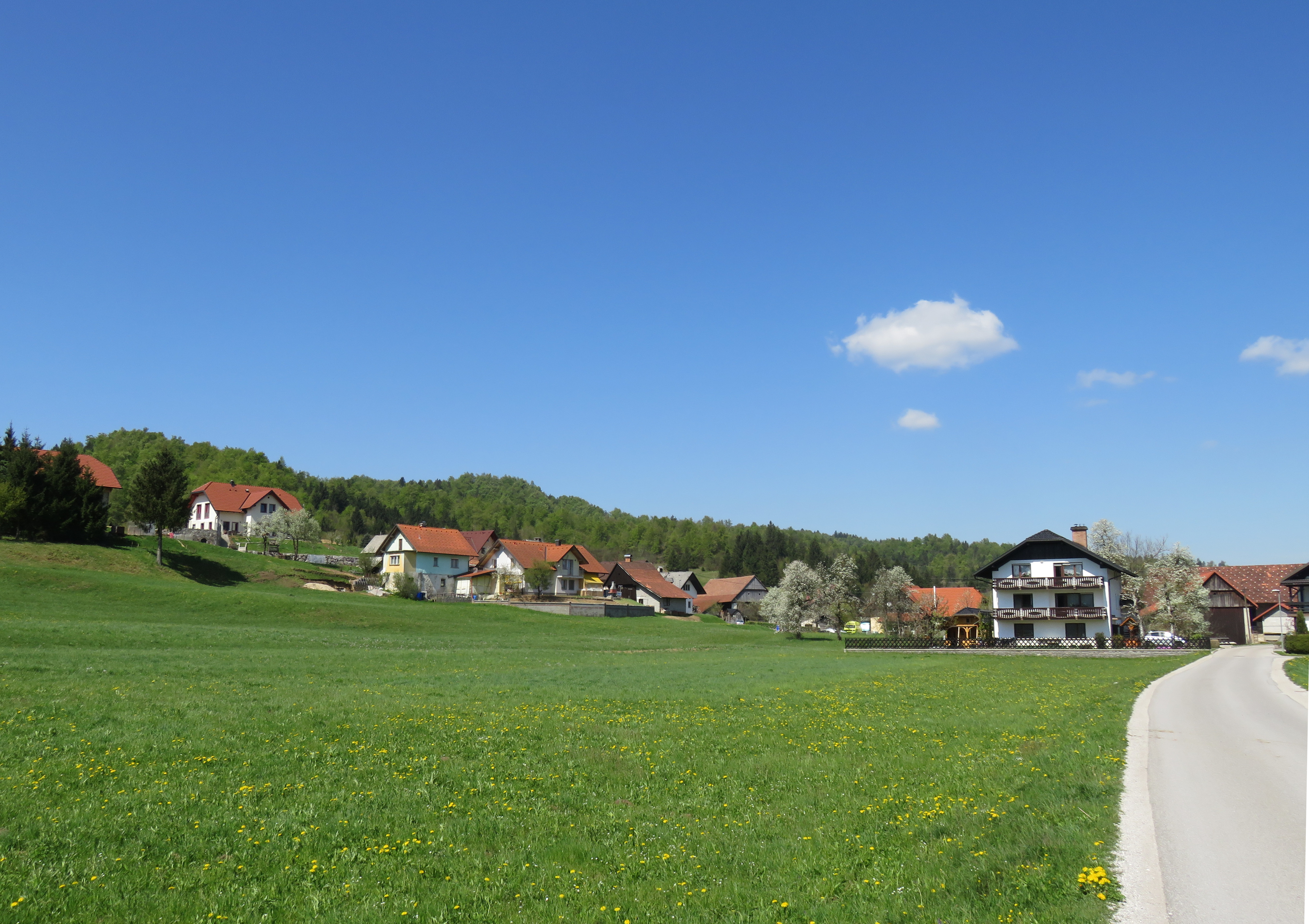

- Location in Slovenia
- Coordinates: 45°54′31″N 14°11′49″E
- Country: Slovenia
- Traditional region: Inner Carniola
- Statistical region: Central Slovenia
- Municipality: Logatec
- Elevation: 480 m (1,570 ft)

Gorenja Vas pod Režišami (pronounced [ɡɔˈɾeːnja ˈʋaːs pɔd ɾɛˈʒiːʃami], Slovene: Gorenja vas pod Režišami, German: Oberdorf) is a former village in western Slovenia in the Municipality of Logatec. It is now part of the town of Logatec. It is part of the traditional region of Inner Carniola and is now included in the Central Slovenia Statistical Region.

== Geography ==
Gorenja Vas pod Režišami is located in the southwestern part of the Logatec Karst Field (Slovene: Logaško polje) along the main road from Vrhnika to Kalce. Black Creek (Slovene: Črni potok) flows through the village, after which it soon joins Reka Creek to form the Logaščica River. The village includes the hamlets of Grad, Klanec, and Podstrmca (German: Podstermez). The soil is gravelly, and the terrain is swampy along the upper reaches of the creek. Režiše Hill (elevation: 595 meters or 1,952 feet) rises southwest of the village.

== Name ==
The name Gorenja vas means 'upper village' and refers to its elevated location compared to the surrounding terrain. The name of the village was changed from Gorenja vas to Gorenja vas pod Režišami ('below Režiše Hill') in 1953.

== History ==
Gorenja Vas had a population of 310 (in 46 houses) in 1880, 259 (in 48 houses) in 1900, and 282 (in 51 houses) in 1931. Gorenja Vas pod Režišami was annexed by Logatec in 1972, ending its existence as a separate settlement.

== Notable people ==
Notable people that were born or lived in Gorenja Vas pod Režišami include:

- Vito Lavrič (1906–1997), gynecologist and obstetrician
