= Gorenji Logatec =

Gorenji Logatec Cerkovska Vas (19th century)
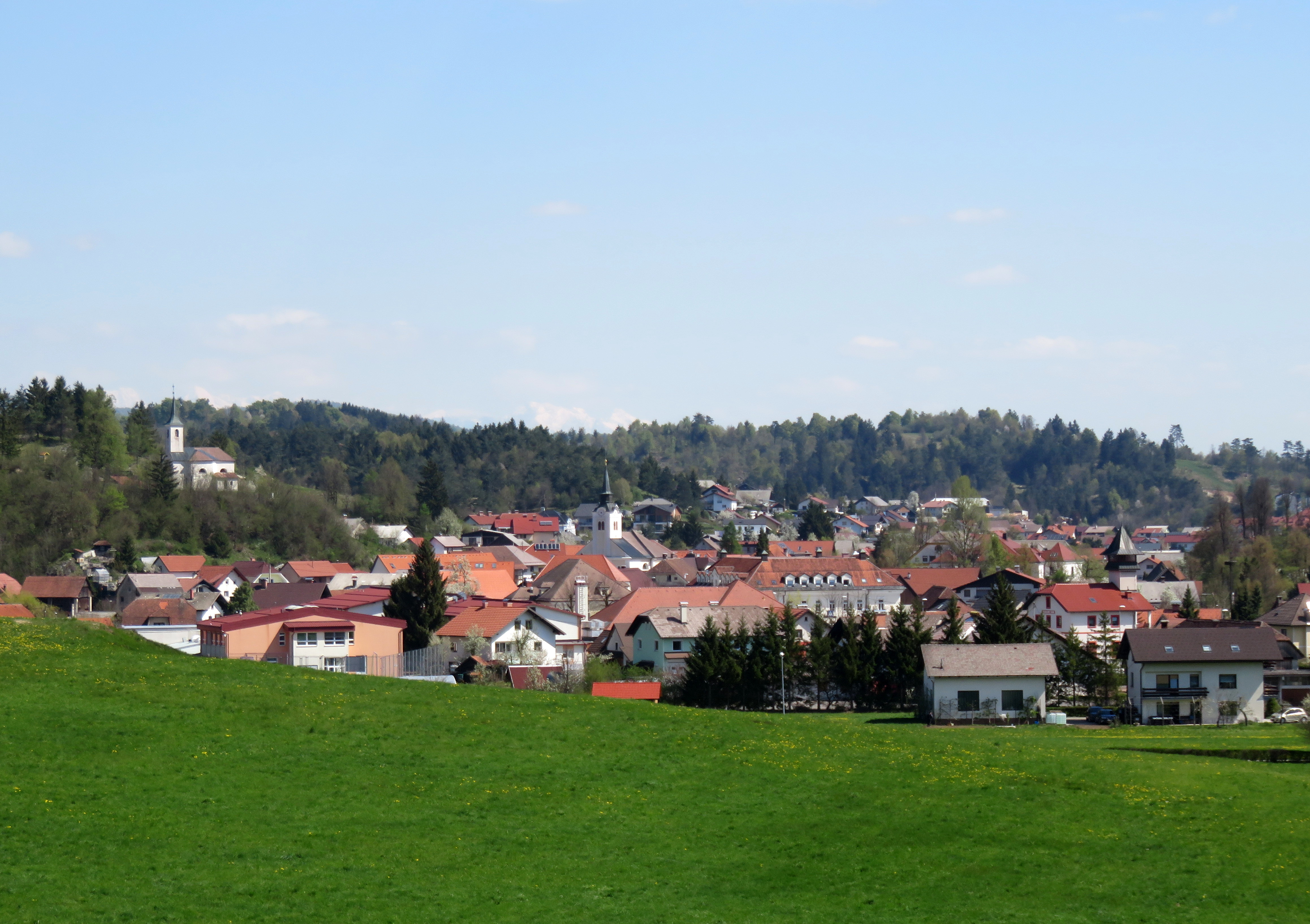

- Location in Slovenia
- Coordinates: 45°54′41″N 14°12′15″E
- Country: Slovenia
- Traditional region: Inner Carniola
- Statistical region: Central Slovenia
- Municipality: Logatec
- Elevation: 486 m (1,594 ft)

Gorenji Logatec (pronounced [ɡɔˈɾeːnji lɔˈɡaːtəts], locally also Gornji Logatec, formerly Cerkovska vas; German: Oberloitsch, formerly Kirchdorf) is a former village in western Slovenia in the Municipality of Logatec. It is now part of the town of Logatec. It is part of the traditional region of Inner Carniola and is now included in the Central Slovenia Statistical Region.

== Geography ==
Gorenji Logatec is located in the western part of the Logatec Karst Field (Slovene: Logaško polje) along the main road from Vrhnika to Kalce. It stands in a narror valley, with Big Bukve Hill (Slovene: Velike Bukve, elevation: 580 meters or 1,900 feet) rising to the north and Sekirica Hill (elevation: 545 meters or 1,788 feet) to the east. The confluence of Black Creek (Slovene: Črni potok) and Reka Creek in the center of the village creates the start of the Logaščica River. There is a gravel pit in the hamlet of Klanec to the north, and the hamlet of Reka stands along Reka Creek.

== Name ==
The name Gorenji Logatec means 'upper Logatec', contrasting with neighboring Dolenji Logatec (literally, 'lower Logatec'). Around the middle of the 18th century, the area around Our Lady of the Rosary Church started being known as Cerkovska vas (literally, 'church village'), with the German equivalent Kirchdorf. The name Cerkovska vas was replaced by Gorenji Logatec by the late 19th century.

== History ==
Together with neighboring Brod, Gorenji Logatec was destroyed by a fire on August 8, 1876. Gorenji Logatec had a population of 452 (in 54 houses) in 1880, 482 (in 60 houses) in 1900, and 426 (in 77 houses) in 1931. Gorenji Logatec was annexed by Logatec in 1972, ending its existence as a separate settlement.

== Churches ==
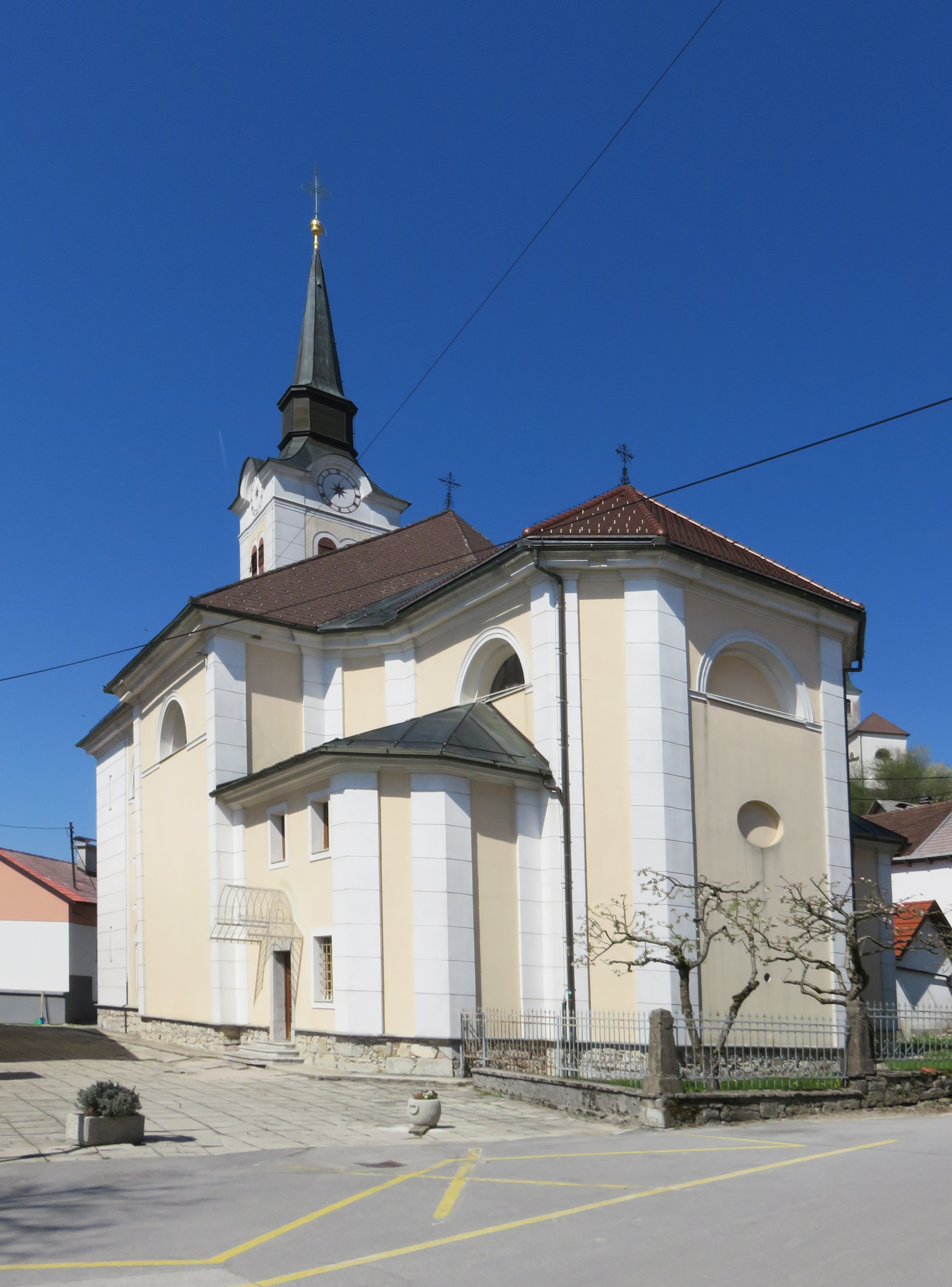
Our Lady of the Rosary Church

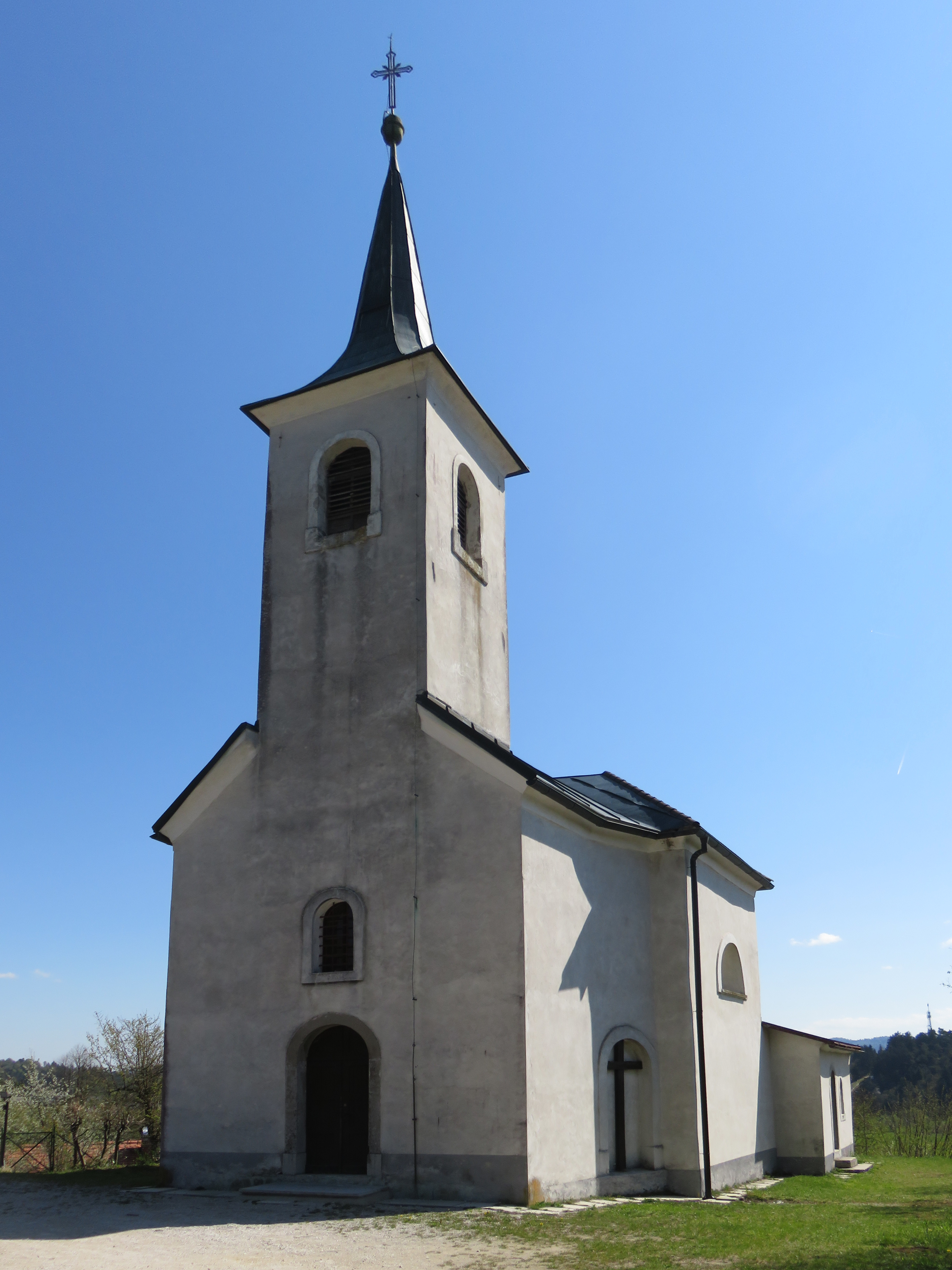
Holy Cross Church

There are two churches in Gorenji Logatec. Our Lady of the Rosary Church is the parish church; it dates from 1754 and stands in the center of the former village. Holy Cross Church stands north of the village center, on the southern slope of Tabor Hill. It is the oldest church in Logatec; it dates from the 16th century and was remodeled in 1765.

== Logatec Castle ==
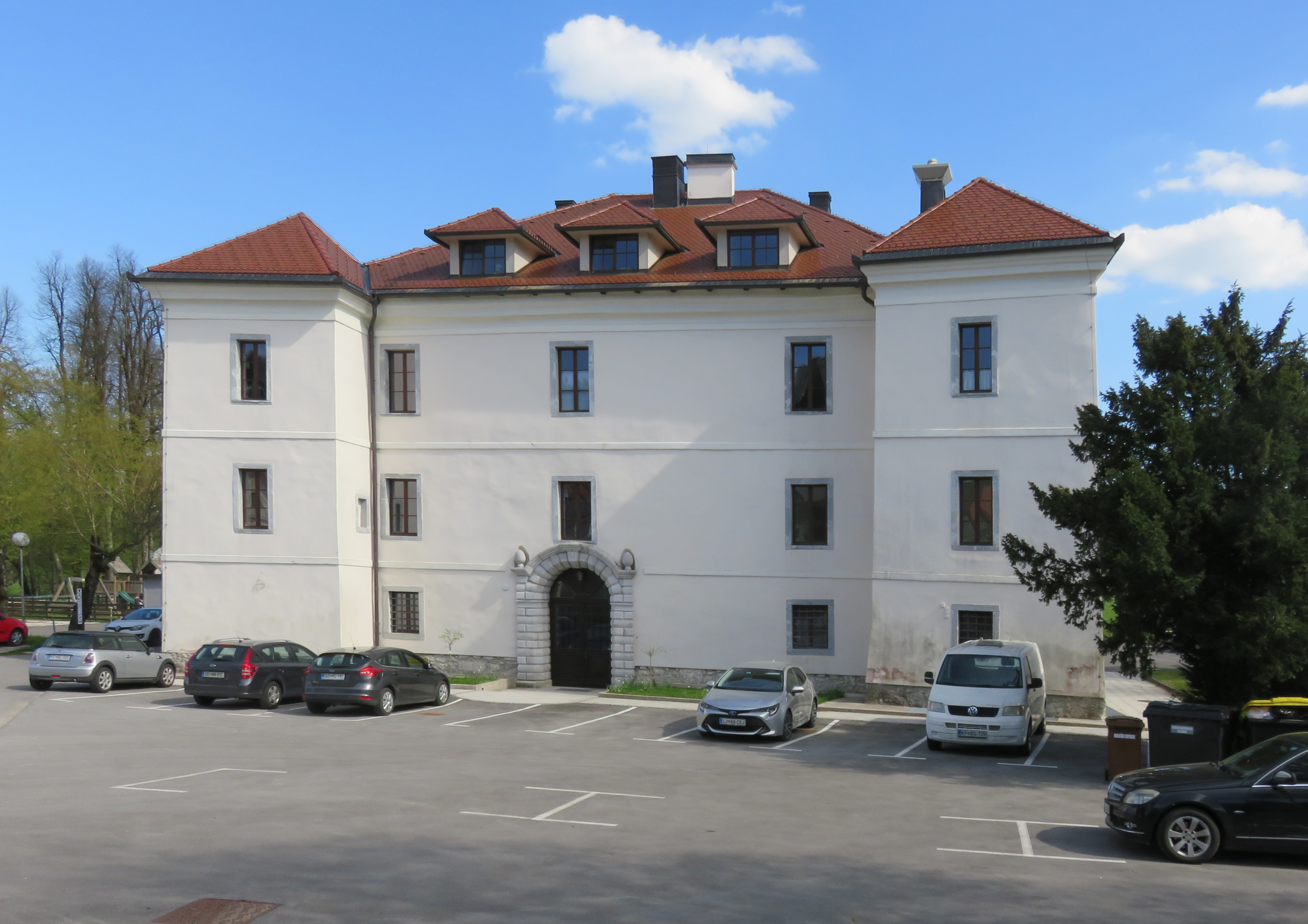
Logatec Castle

Logatec Castle (Slovene: Grad Logatec) stands across the main road, southwest of the settlement. It replaced an older castle that stood near Holy Cross Church on Tabor Hill and was already in ruins by the 17th century. The origins of Logatec Castle go back to the late Middle Ages, and it was remodeled in the 16th, 18th (by Carlo Martinuzzi, c. 1673–1726), and 20th centuries. The castle was originally the seat of the Dominion of Logatec and was then owned by the Windisch-Graetz family until 1848, when it became the property of the local administration. It was used as offices until 1932, and the local court was housed in it from 1906 to 1945. After the Second World War, it served as a boys' school until 1966. It is now used as residential apartments.

== Notable people ==
Notable people that were born or lived in Gorenji Logatec include:

- Josip Cerk (1881–1912), geographer and speleologist
- Jernej Medved (1799–1857), religious writer and lexicographer
- Ivan Milavec (1874–1915), organ manucaturer
- Vladimir Mušič (1893–1973), architect
- Lev Svetek (1914–2005), lawyer and pedagogue
- Vladimir Travner (1886–1940), historian
- Ignacij Gruntar (1844–1922), lawyer and notary
