= Brod–Logatec =

Brod–Logatec Brod (until 1955)
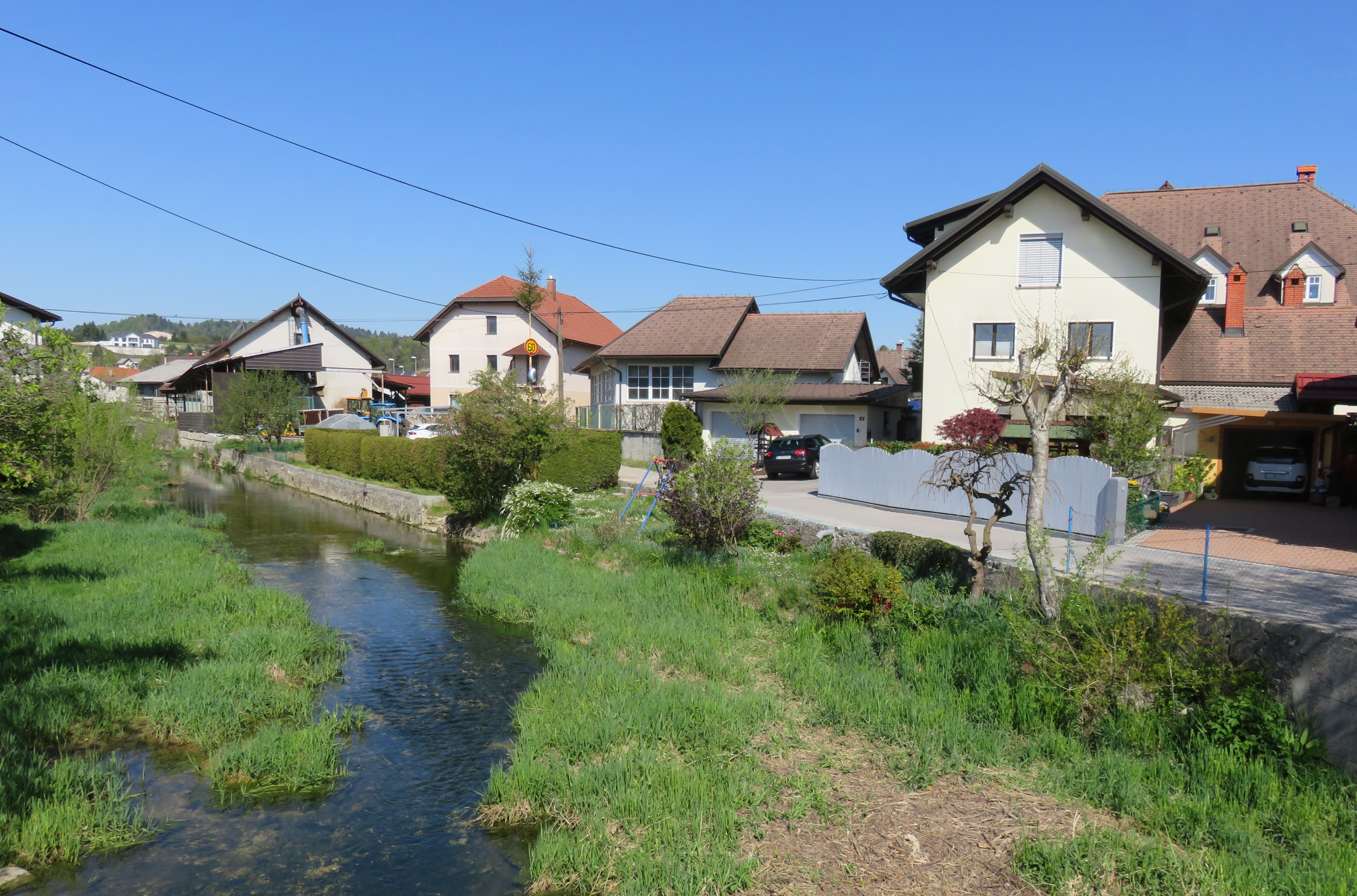

- Location in Slovenia
- Coordinates: 45°54′57″N 14°13′16″E
- Country: Slovenia
- Traditional region: Inner Carniola
- Statistical region: Central Slovenia
- Municipality: Logatec
- Elevation: 498 m (1,634 ft)

Brod–Logatec (pronounced [ˈbɾoːt lɔˈɡaːtəts]) is a former village in western Slovenia in the Municipality of Logatec. It is now part of the town of Logatec. It is part of the traditional region of Inner Carniola and is now included in the Central Slovenia Statistical Region.

== Geography ==
Brod–Logatec is located along both sides of the Logaščica River in the western part of Logatec. Blekova Vas lies to the west, and Čevica and Dolenji Logatec to the east. The soil is gravelly, and the land is subject to flooding during heavy rains.

== Name ==
The name Brod means 'ford' and refers to a location where it was easy to cross the Logaščica River. The name of the village was changed from Brod to Brod–Logatec in 1955.

== History ==
Together with neighboring Gorenji Logatec, Brod was destroyed by a fire on August 8, 1876. Brod had a population of 160 (in 23 houses) in 1880, and 149 (in 24 houses) in 1900. Brod–Logatec was annexed by Logatec in 1972, ending its existence as a separate settlement.
