= Čevica =

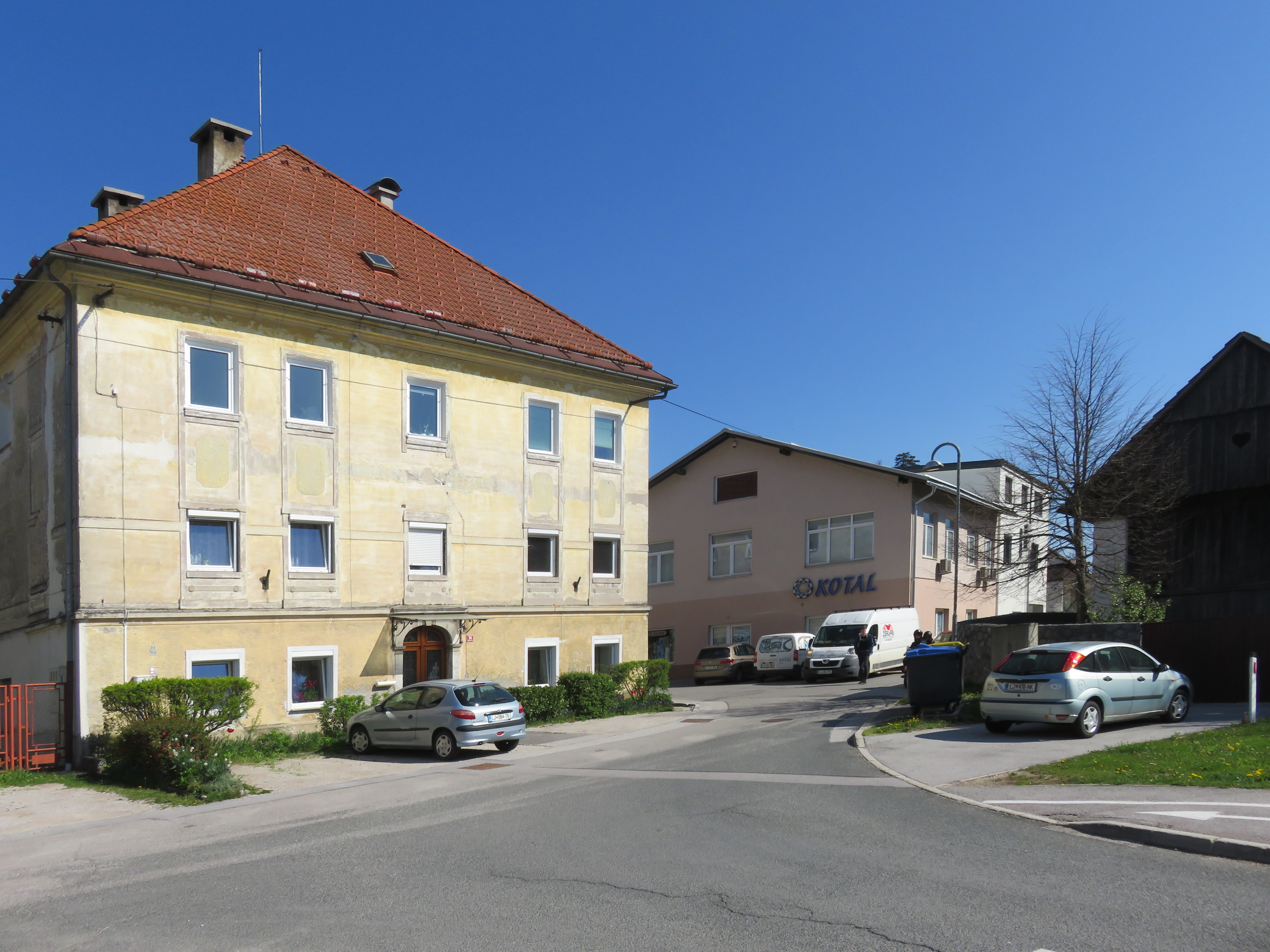

- Location in Slovenia
- Coordinates: 45°55′06″N 14°13′36″E
- Country: Slovenia
- Traditional region: Inner Carniola
- Statistical region: Central Slovenia
- Municipality: Logatec
- Elevation: 498 m (1,634 ft)

Čevica (pronounced [ˈtʃeːʋitsa], in older sources Čevice, German: Tscheuze) is a former village in western Slovenia in the Municipality of Logatec. It is now part of the town of Logatec. It is part of the traditional region of Inner Carniola and is now included in the Central Slovenia Statistical Region.

== Geography ==
Čevica is located in the center of the Logatec Basin (Slovene: Logaška kotlina). It adjoins Brod–Logatec to the south and Dolenji Logatec to the east, creating a continuous urban fabric with them. The Empty Karst Field (Slovene: Pusto polje), with fields and meadows on gravelly soil, lies to the north.

== History ==
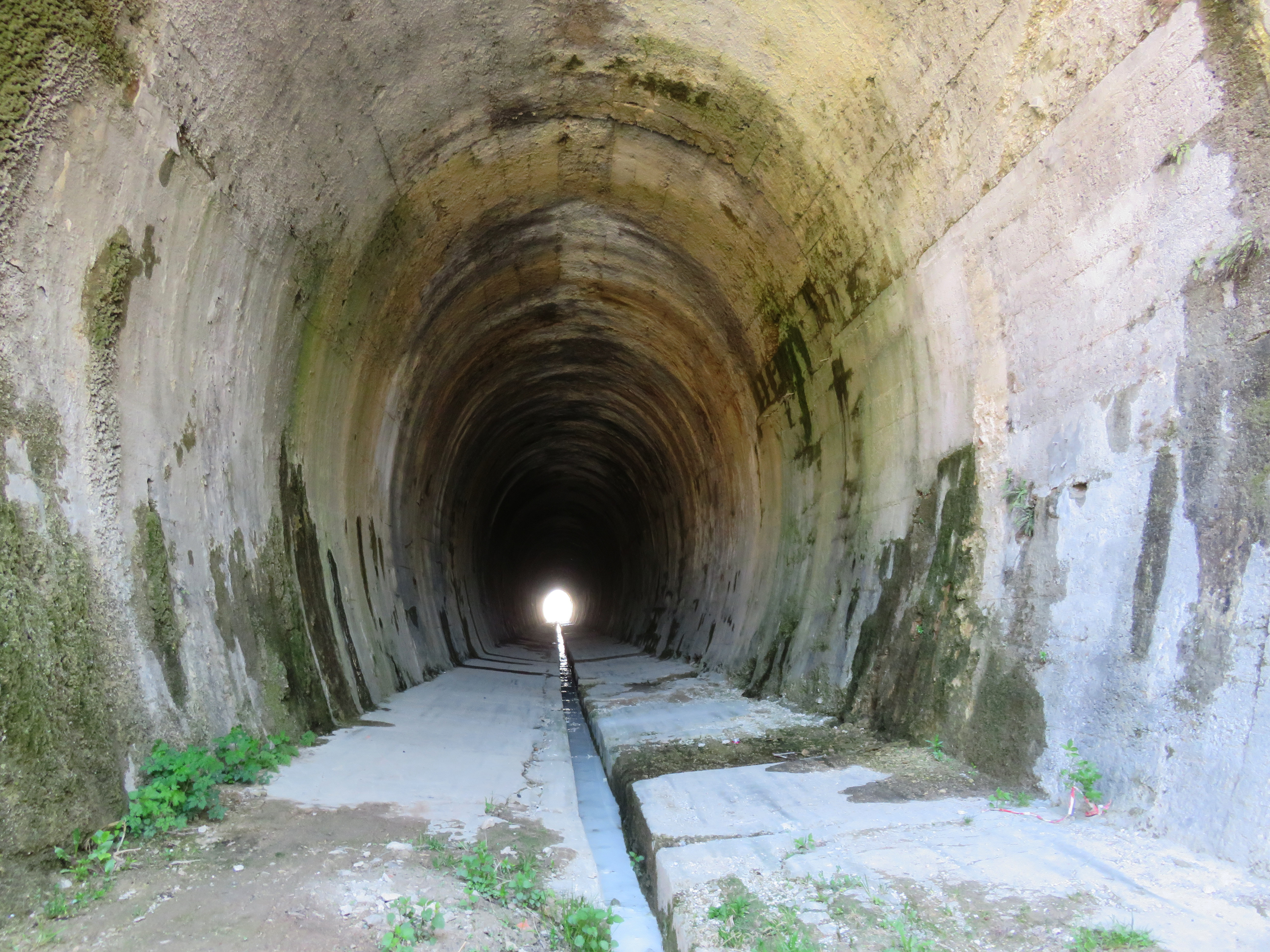
Rail tunnel under Naklo Hill

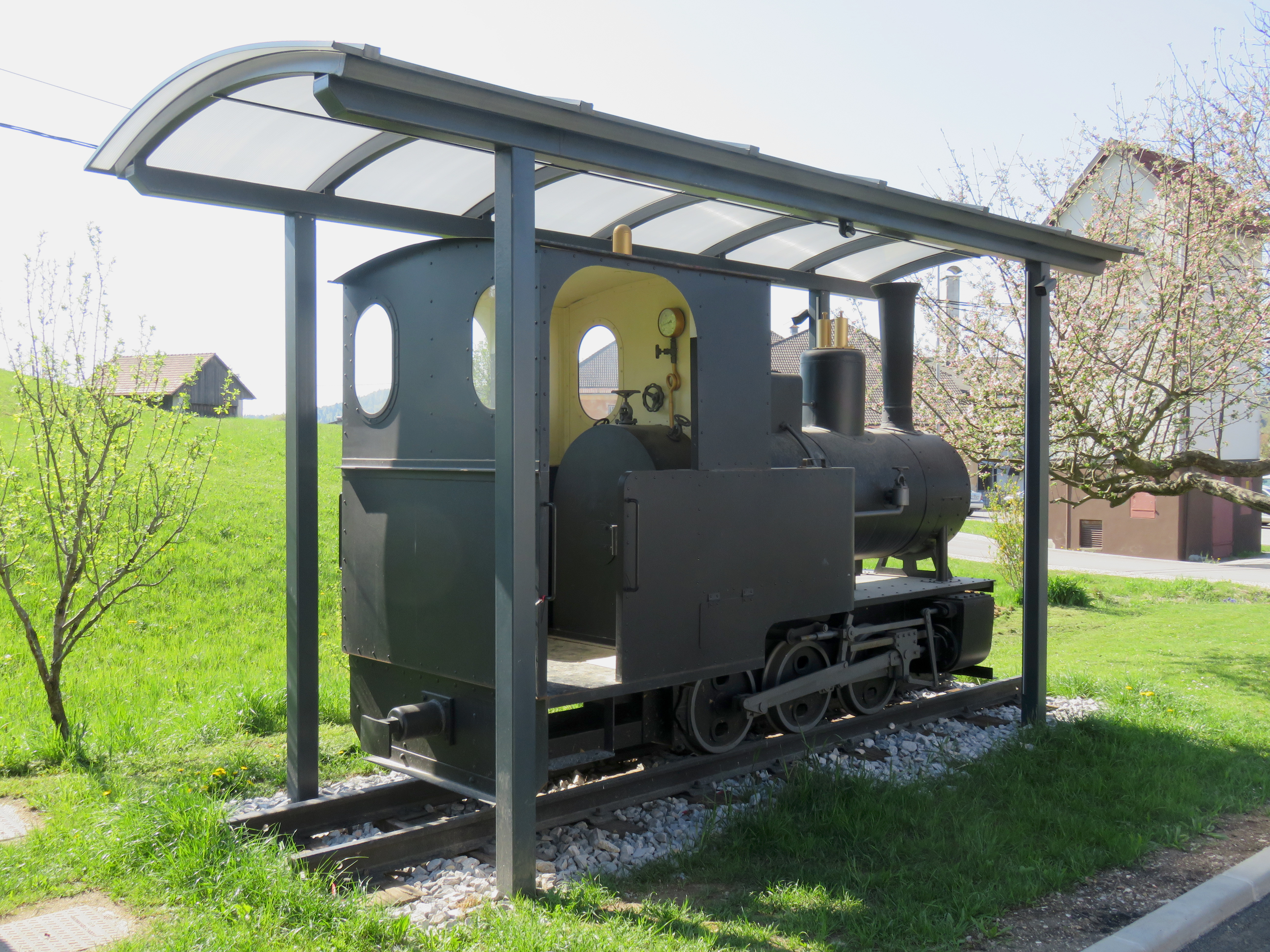
Mašinka: replica of an Orenstein & Koppel 40 Hp 600 mm locomotive

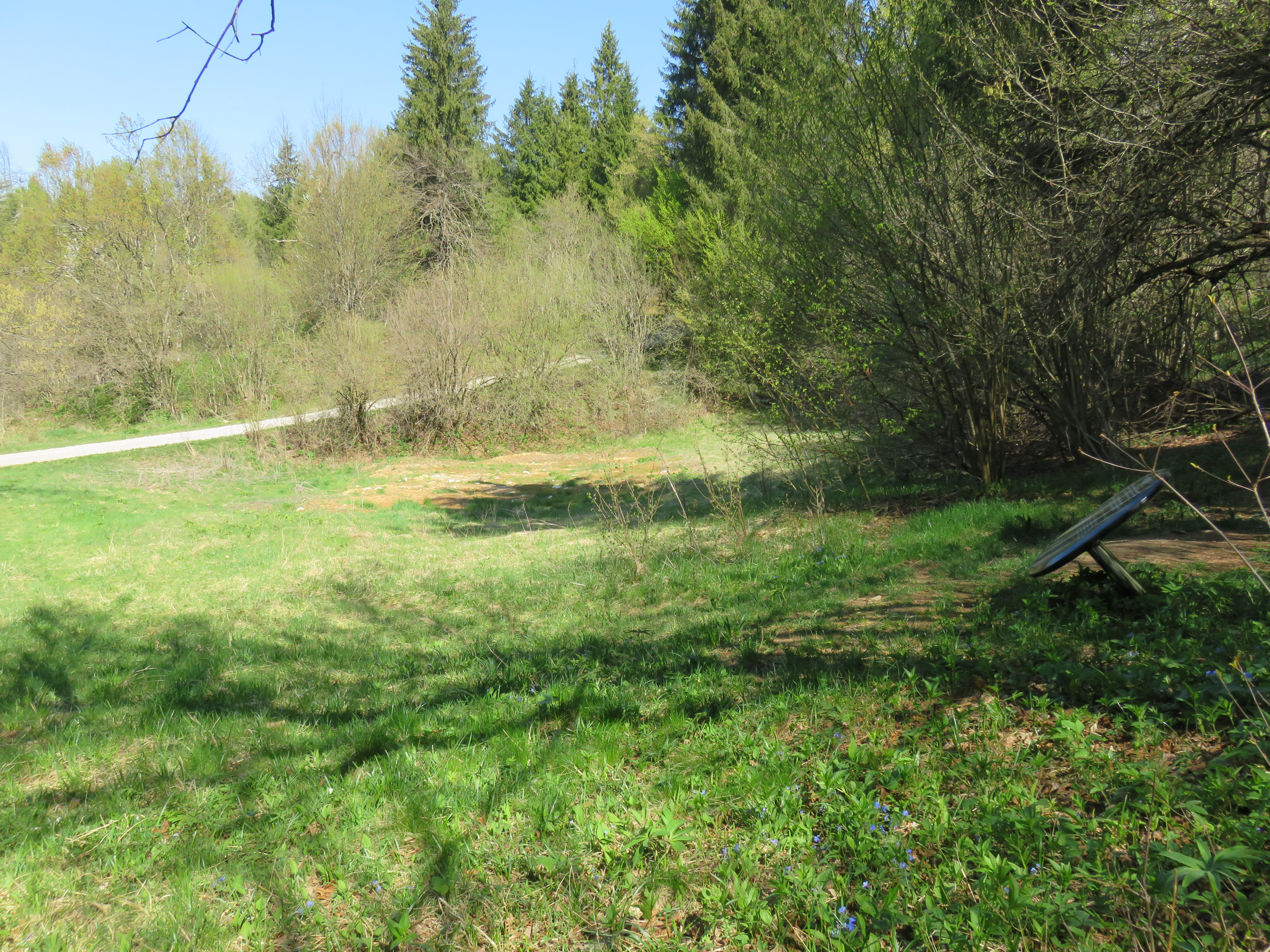
B-24 crash site

The village burned in a fire in 1874. During the First World War, a tunnel was excavated by Russian prisoners of war under Naklo Hill in Čevica to serve as part of the rail line from Logatec to Črni Vrh. The line was used to deliver material to the Isonzo Front. The tunnel also served as a bomb shelter during the Second World War.

During the Second World War, an American B-24 Liberator bomber named Double Trouble crashed in Kotlice, a wooded area north of Čevica, near the base of Sleme Hill (elevation: 578 meters or 1,896 feet) on February 24, 1944. The bomber had been on a mission to bomb factories in Regensburg, but the aircraft was attacked by German fighter planes en route and caught fire. Five crew members bailed out and survived, and were taken prisoner. The remainder of the crew—four gunners and the pilot, Edwin H. Pries (1918–1944)—were killed in the initial attack and crash. The remains of the bomber and the bodies of its crew were looted by locals, and the dead were buried in Dolenji Logatec. Their remains were initially reinterred in Belgrade in 1946, and then in Italy and the United States in 1949. A memorial was installed at the crash site in 2014.

Čevica had a population of 326 (in 43 houses) in 1880, 332 (in 50 houses) in 1900, and 416 (in 64 houses) in 1931. Čevica was annexed by Logatec in 1972, ending its existence as a separate settlement.

== Church ==
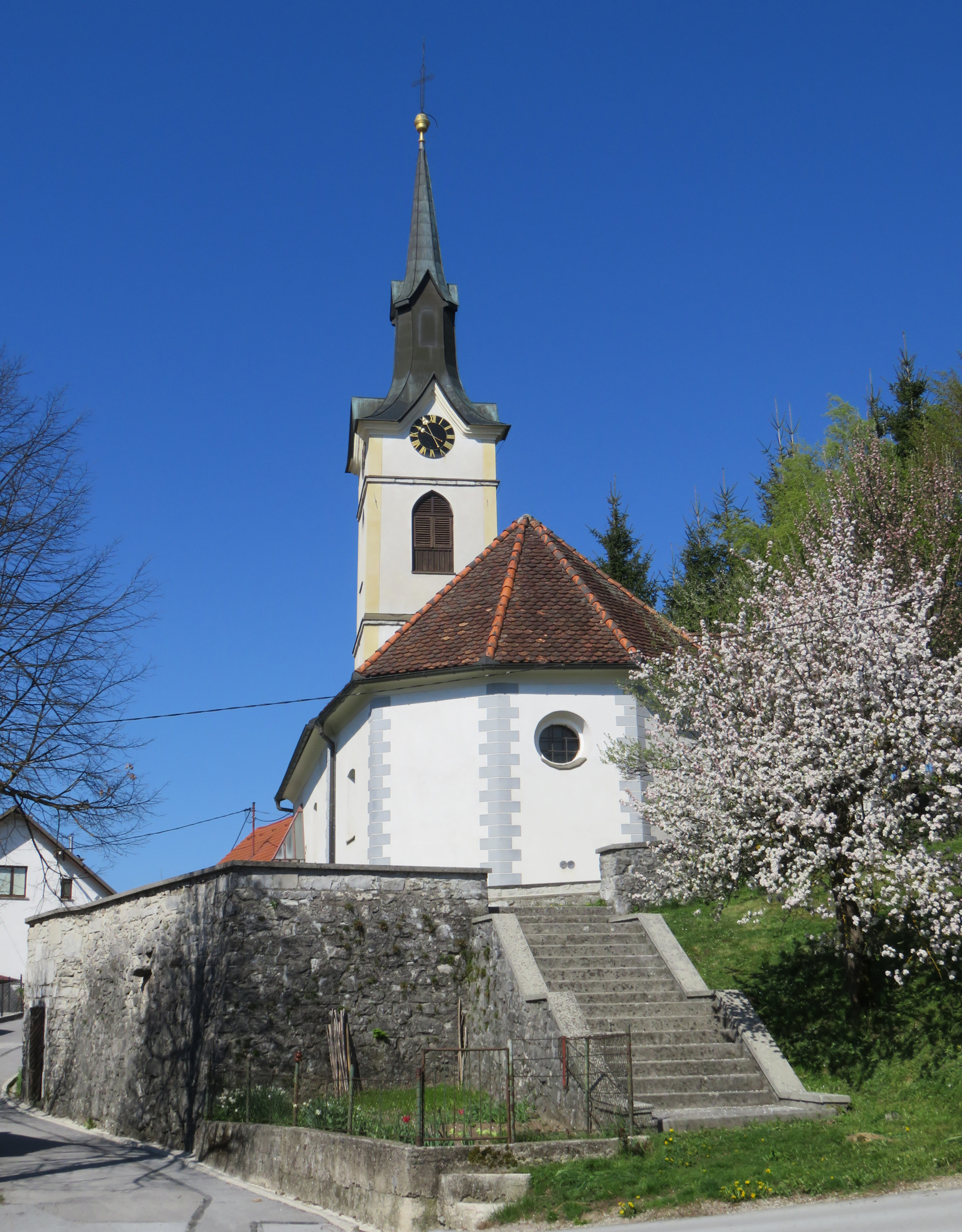
Saint Joseph's Church

The church in Čevica is dedicated to Saint Joseph. It dates from the first half of the 16th century and features an 18th-century fresco of the Coronation of the Virgin by Franc Ksaver Oblak.

== Tolazzi's Well ==
Tolazzi's Well (Slovene: Tollazijeva štirna) was built in 1883 by commission from the village merchant Tomà Tollazzi. The well is filled by spring water because Logatec did not receive a water distribution system until 14 years later. Its architectural and artistic design make it a unique example among fountains and wells in the Logatec area. The design concept is based on similar fountains in the Friuli region, expressing cultural, historical, technical, architectural, artistic, and landscape values. Tollazzi's Well was designated a monument of local interest in the second half of 2008. In 2009 it was renovated by the Municipality of Logatec with its own funds, funds from the Ministry of Agriculture, Forestry, and Food, and resources from the Helios fund for keeping Slovenian waters clean. Each year on bonfire night (June 24), an ethnology and music event known as the Evening by the Well (Večer pri vodnjaku) is held next to the well.
