= Logaščica =

Logaščica Creek
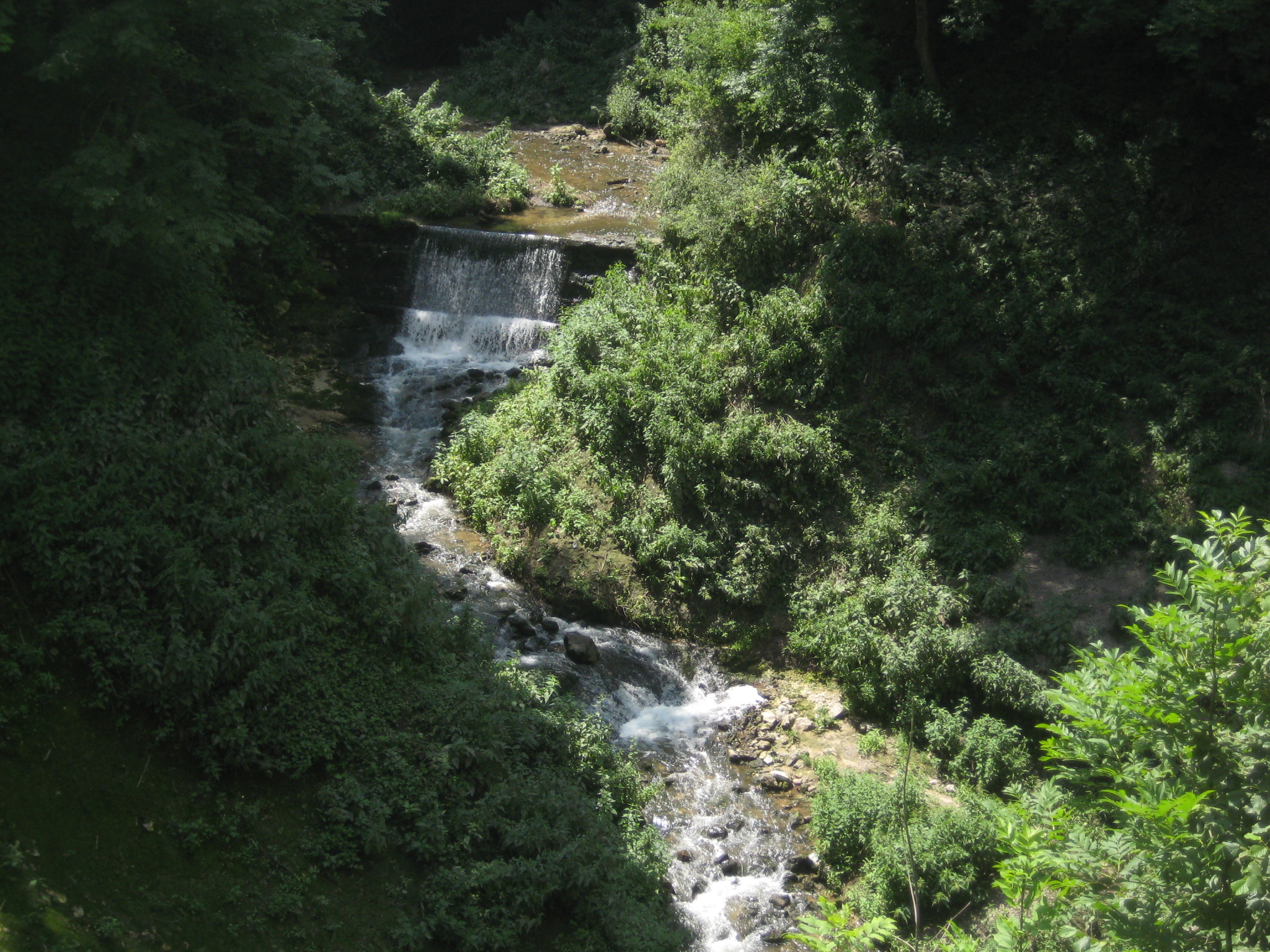
- Logaščica Creek at the Jakča Sinkhole

Location
- Country: Slovenia

Physical characteristics
- Source
  - location: Confluence of Reka Creek and Black Creek (Slovene: Črni potok) in the Logatec Karst Field
- Mouth
  - location: Sinks into the Jakča Sinkhole in the Logatec Karst Field
  - coordinates: 45°54′58.20″N 14°13′57.99″E

Basin features
- Progression: Ljubljanica→ Sava→ Danube→ Black Sea

Logaščica Creek is a stream that flows across the Logatec Karst Field and collects water from the western dolomite area of the karst field. Logaščica Creek starts at the confluence of Reka Creek and Black Creek (Slovene: Črni potok) in Gorenji Logatec and it sinks into the walled Jačka Sinkhole. The stream often floods. After it flows into the ground, it joins water from the Planina Karst Field (Slovene: Planinsko polje) and drains below the Logatec Karst Field towards Močilnik Springs and other sources of the Ljubljanica in Vrhnika.
