= Martinj Hrib =

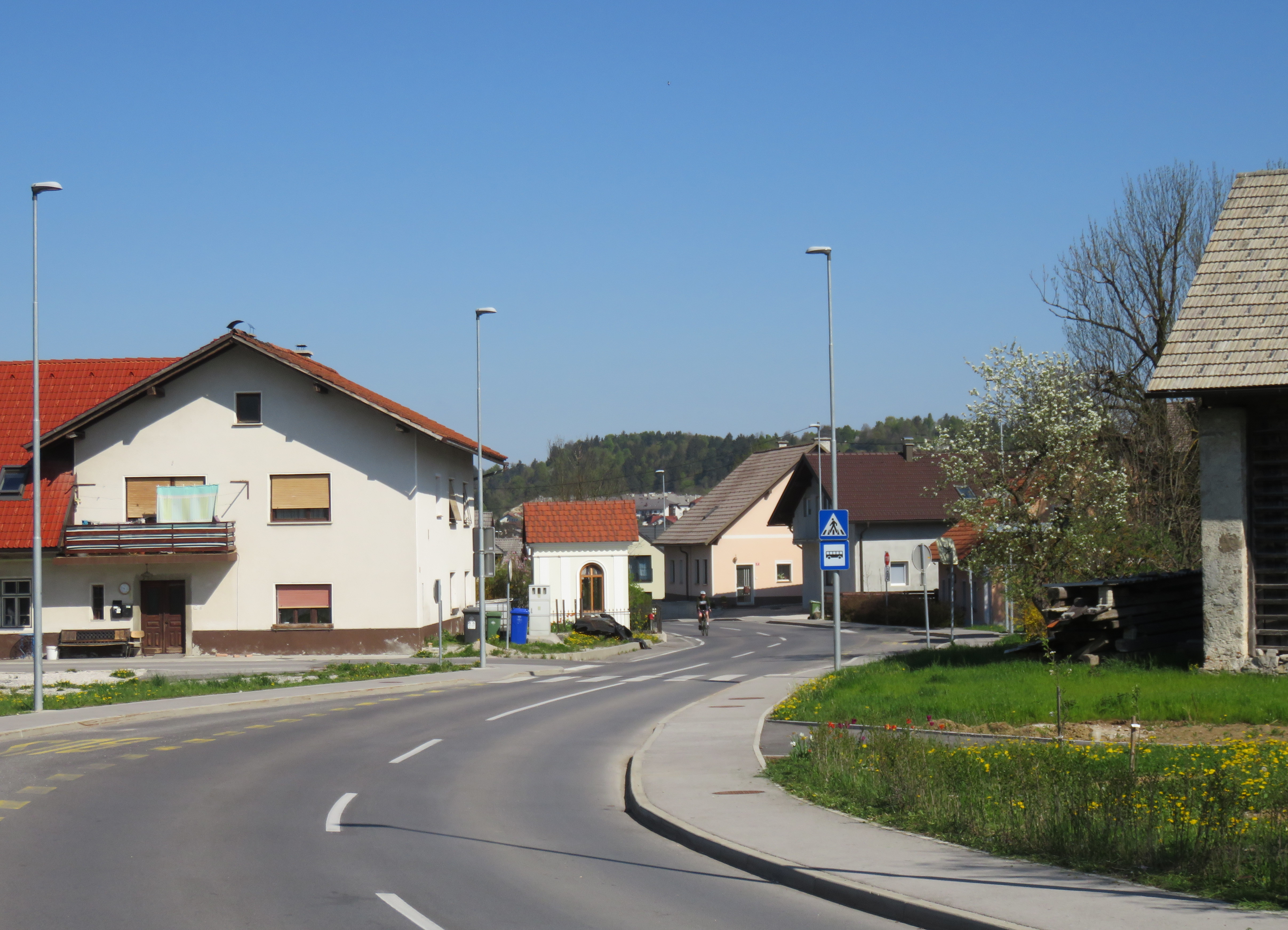

- Location in Slovenia
- Coordinates: 45°54′31″N 14°13′46″E
- Country: Slovenia
- Traditional region: Inner Carniola
- Statistical region: Central Slovenia
- Municipality: Logatec
- Elevation: 490 m (1,610 ft)

Martinj Hrib (pronounced [maɾˈtiːn ˈxɾːip], in older sources also Martinji Hrib) is a former village in western Slovenia in the Municipality of Logatec. It is now part of the town of Logatec. It is part of the traditional region of Inner Carniola and is now included in the Central Slovenia Statistical Region.

== Geography ==
Martinj Hrib is located in the southeastern part of the Logatec Karst Field (Slovene: Logaško polje), along the road from Logatec to Laze. The area is heavily karstified; the land is forested to the east and south, with sinkholes and caves, as well as the Logatec Collapse Dolines (Slovene: Logaške koliševke), which were created when the roofs of caves fell in.

== History ==
Along with the rest of Logatec, Martinj Hrib was affected by a plague outbreak in 1836; a chapel-shrine in the village commemorates the epidemic. Martinj Hrib had a population of 229 (in 30 houses) in 1880, 247 (in 37 houses) in 1900, and 290 (in 27 houses) in 1931. Martinj Hrib was annexed by Logatec in 1972, ending its existence as a separate settlement.
