= Žibrše =

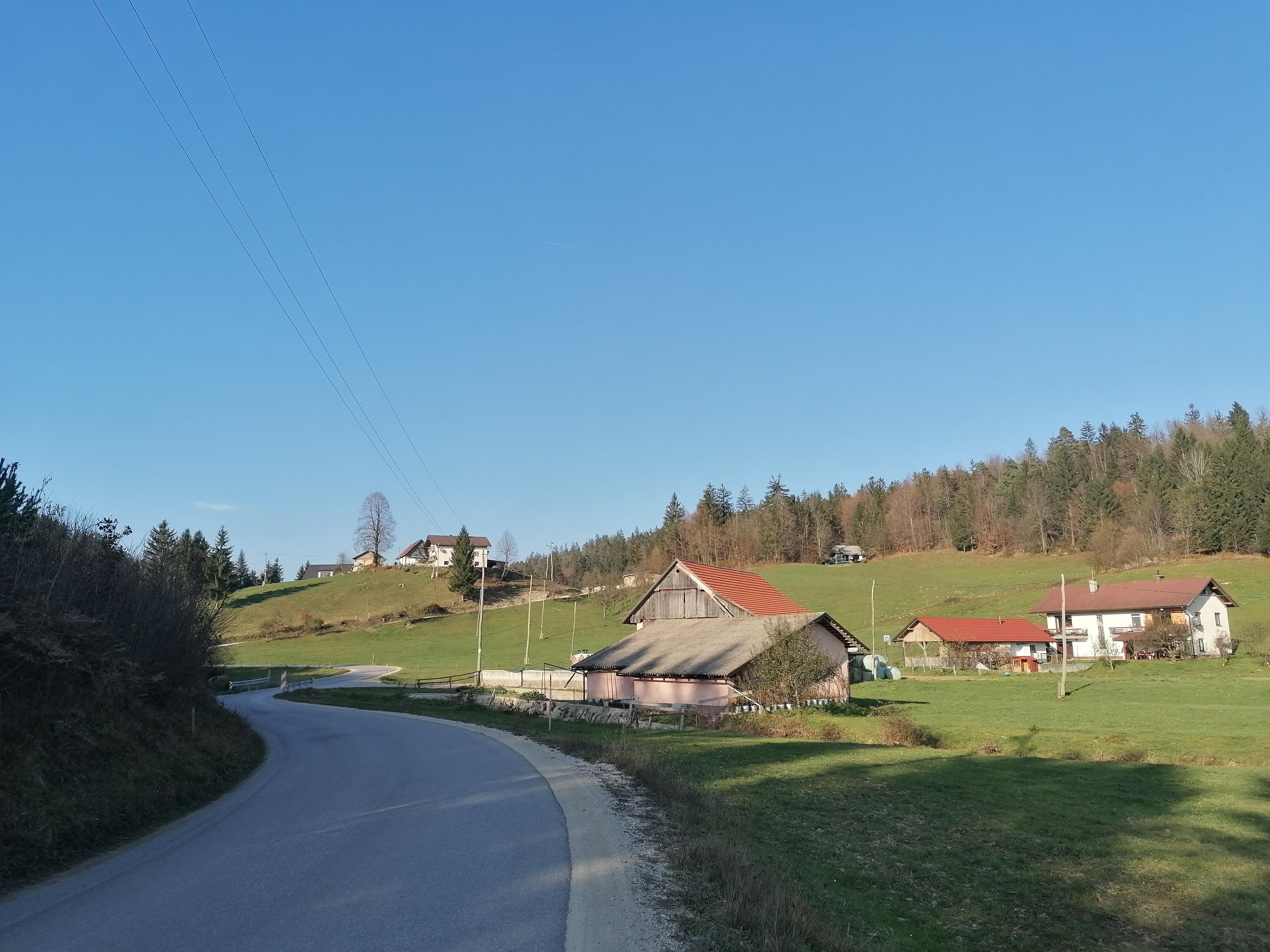

- Location in Slovenia
- Coordinates: 45°56′8.11″N 14°10′33.88″E
- Country: Slovenia
- Traditional region: Inner Carniola
- Statistical region: Central Slovenia
- Municipality: Logatec

Area
  - Total: 13.34 km^{2} (5.15 sq mi)
- Elevation: 694.6 m (2,279 ft)

Population (2002)
  - Total: 168

Žibrše (pronounced [ˈʒiːbəɾʃɛ], German: Sibersche) is a dispersed settlement in the hills northwest of Logatec in the Inner Carniola region of Slovenia.
