= Logatec Karst Field =

Coordinates: 45°55′00″N 14°13′47″E

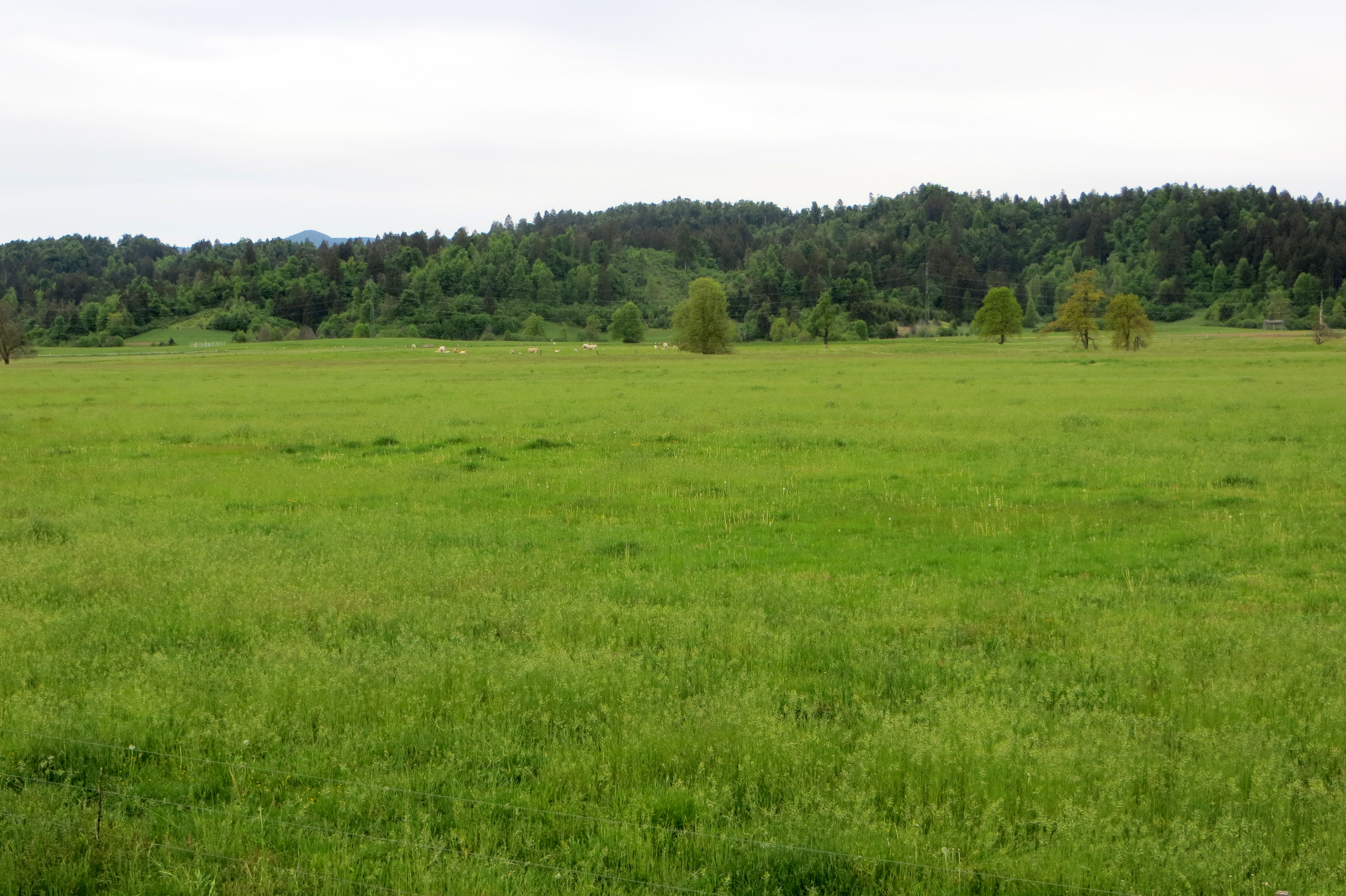
The Empty Karst Field (Pusto polje), part of the Logatec Karst Field

The Logatec Karst Field or Logatec Polje (pronounced [lɔˈɡaːtəts]; Slovene: Logaško polje) is a karst field near Logatec in southwestern Slovenia (the traditional region of Inner Carniola). Geographically, it corresponds to the floor of the Logatec Basin (Slovene: Logaška kotlina). It lies at an elevation between 470 meters (1,540 ft) and 490 meters (1,610 ft) and encompasses about 6 square kilometers (2.3 sq mi) of mostly grassy terrain. Logaščica Creek, a losing stream, runs across the karst field and collects ambient water. The karst field often flooded in the past, and so land improvement was carried out. The northern part of the Logatec Karst Field is called the Empty Karst Field (Pusto polje) and the main road from Logatec to Vrhnika runs across it, passing through the linden-lined section known as the Napoleon Avenue (Napoleonov drevored). The southern part of the karst field is known as the Lower Logatec Karst Field (Spodnje logaško polje), or metonymically as the Logatec Karst Field (Logaško polje). The A1 Freeway from Ljubljana to Koper passes along the southeast edge of the karst field.
