= Blekova Vas =

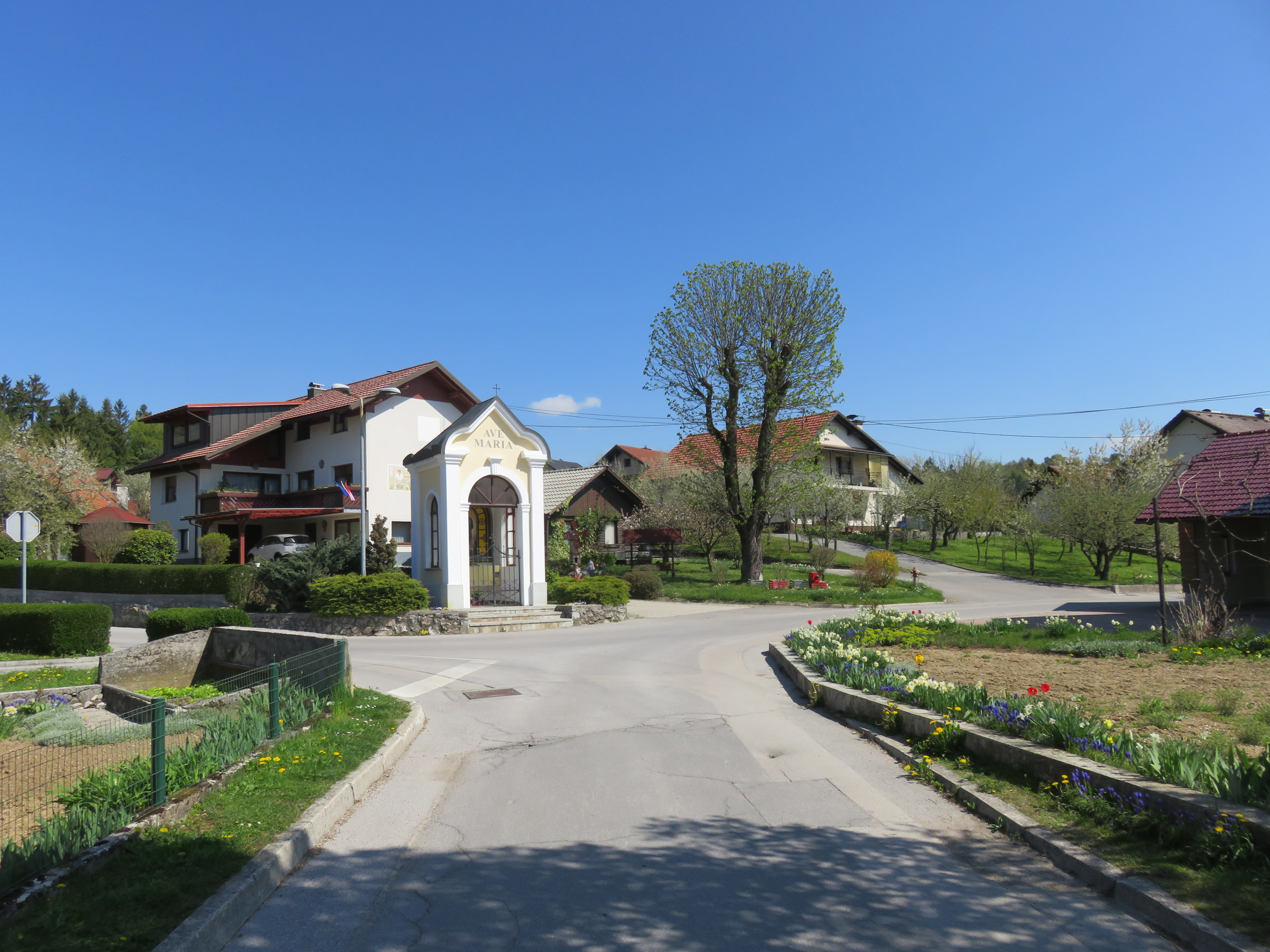

- Location in Slovenia
- Coordinates: 45°55′03″N 14°12′46″E
- Country: Slovenia
- Traditional region: Inner Carniola
- Statistical region: Central Slovenia
- Municipality: Logatec
- Elevation: 498 m (1,634 ft)

Blekova Vas (pronounced [blɛˈkoːʋa ˈʋaːs], Slovene: Blekova vas, German: Fleckdorf) is a former village in western Slovenia in the Municipality of Logatec. It is now part of the town of Logatec. It is part of the traditional region of Inner Carniola and is now included in the Central Slovenia Statistical Region.

== Geography ==
Blekova Vas is located in the Logatec Karst Field west of the center of Logatec, north of the road from Vrhnika to Kalce. The soil is gravelly and there are extensive meadows. The Blekova Commons (Blekovske gmajne) lies to the northwest, and south of the village rises Sekirica Hill (545 meters or 1,788 feet) with a ski jump built by Stanko Bloudek. Lokva Pond lies at the foot of Sekirica Hill and is a habitat for fish and crustaceans. It is said that mercury was found in the past in Kobal Spring (Kobalov studenec) in the village, which has since been filled, and it was assumed that it was connected with a deposit extending to Idrija.

== Name ==
Blekova Vas was attested in historical sources as Dablokova and Dablo Konc between 1763 and 1787. The name Blekova vas appears to mean 'Blek's village', and it is presumed that it is derived from the personal name Blek, probably a metathesis of a name similar to Old High German Walh or Waliko. A less likely theory derives the name from the common noun blek 'patch'.

== History ==
Blekova Vas is believed to be the oldest settlement in the Logatec area. The Krvave Jame area along the old road north of the village is an archaeological site where artifacts have been found from the late Middle Ages and early modern Era. Oral tradition states that a battle with French troops took place at Krvave Jame during the time of the Illyrian Provinces. The village burned in a fire in 1874.

Blekova Vas had a population of 138 (in 19 houses) in 1880, and 148 (in 21 houses) in 1900. Blekova Vas was annexed by Logatec in 1972, ending its existence as a separate settlement.
