= Rovtarske Žibrše =

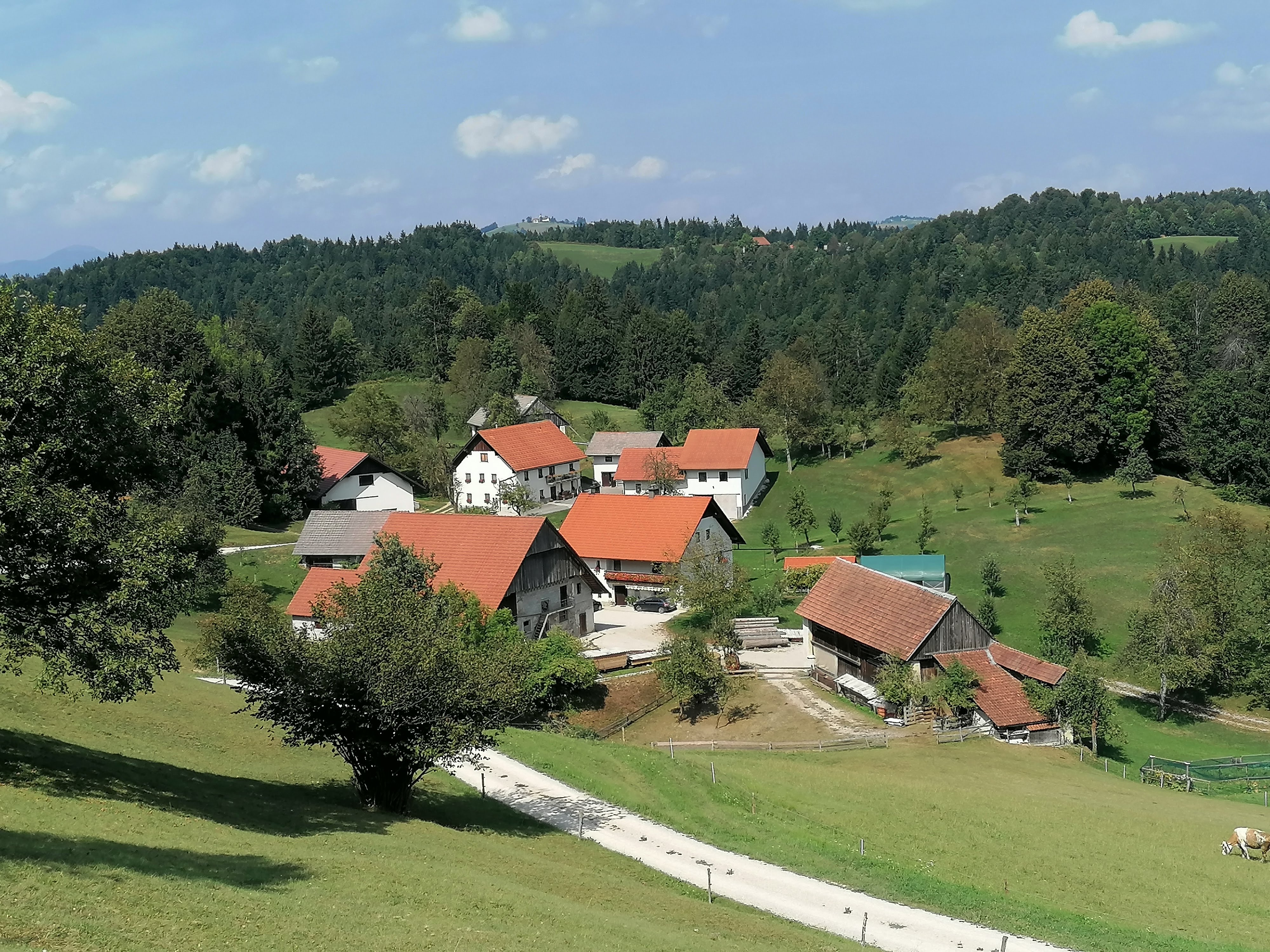

- Location in Slovenia
- Coordinates: 45°57′51.15″N 14°9′54.74″E
- Country: Slovenia
- Traditional region: Inner Carniola
- Statistical region: Central Slovenia
- Municipality: Logatec

Area
  - Total: 6.42 km^{2} (2.48 sq mi)
- Elevation: 660.8 m (2,168 ft)

Population (2002)
  - Total: 199

Rovtarske Žibrše (pronounced [ˈɾoːu̯taɾskɛ ˈzbiːɾʃɛ]) is a dispersed settlement south of Rovte in the Municipality of Logatec in the Inner Carniola region of Slovenia.
