= Logatec =

- Town
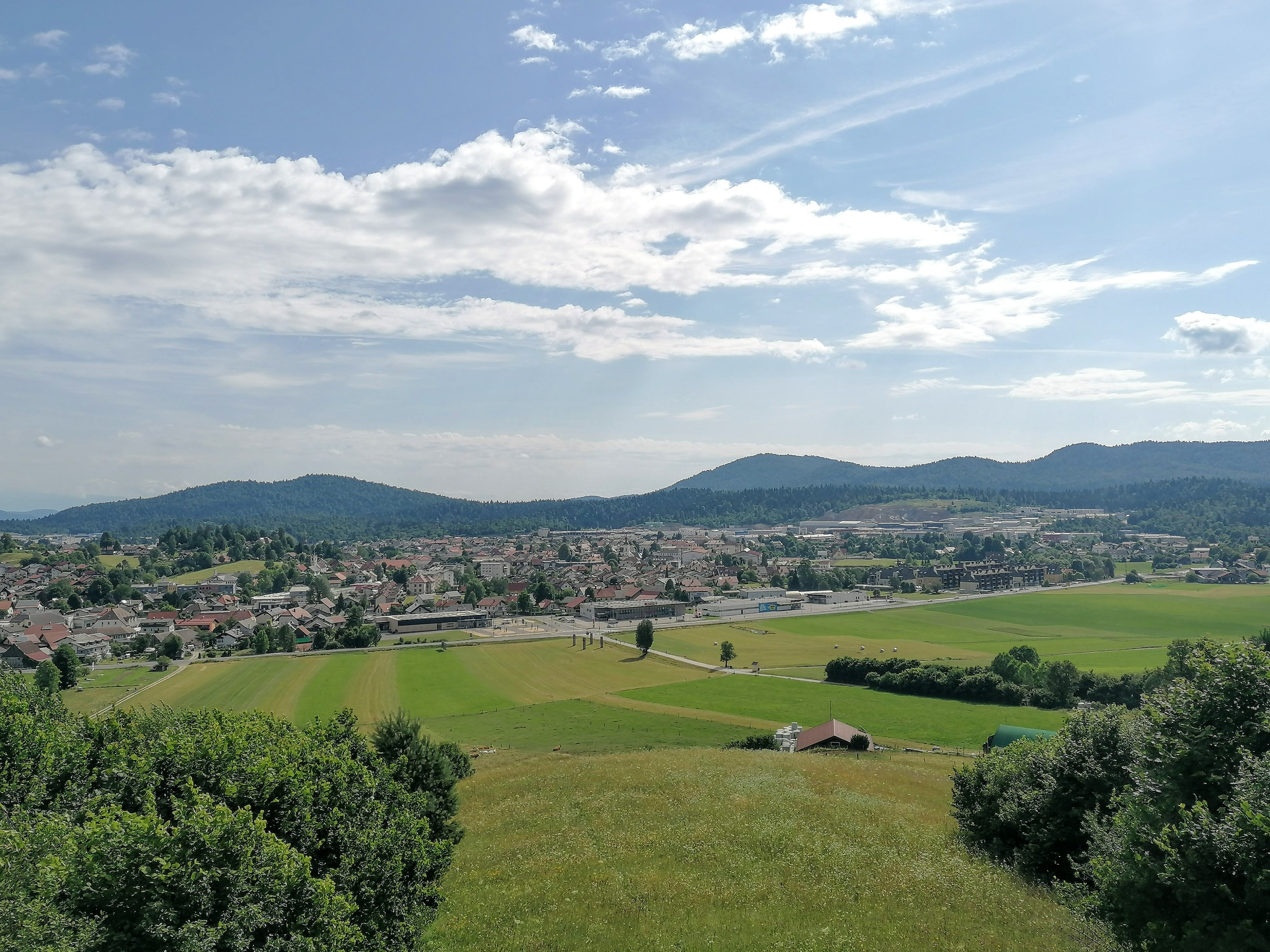
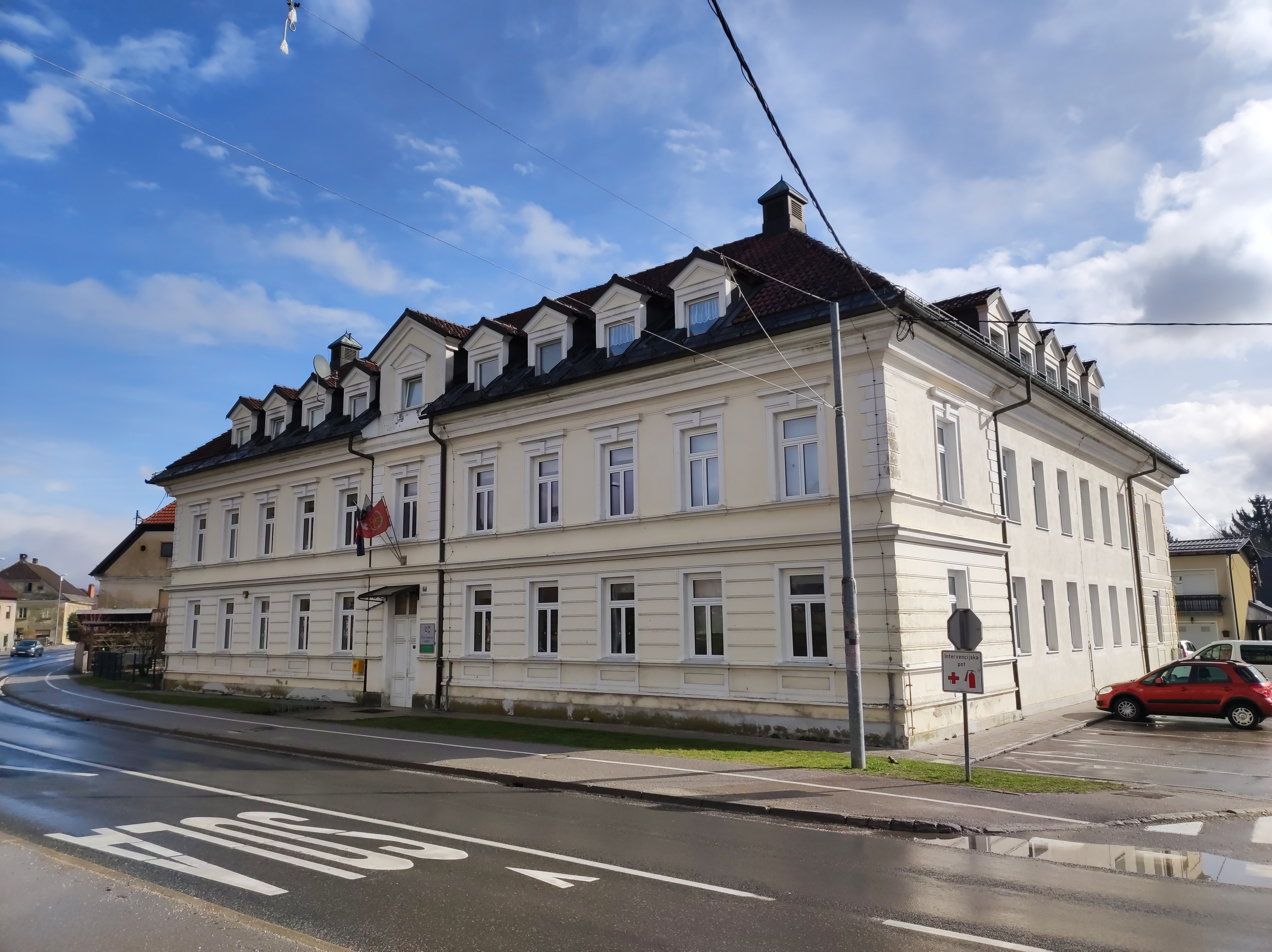
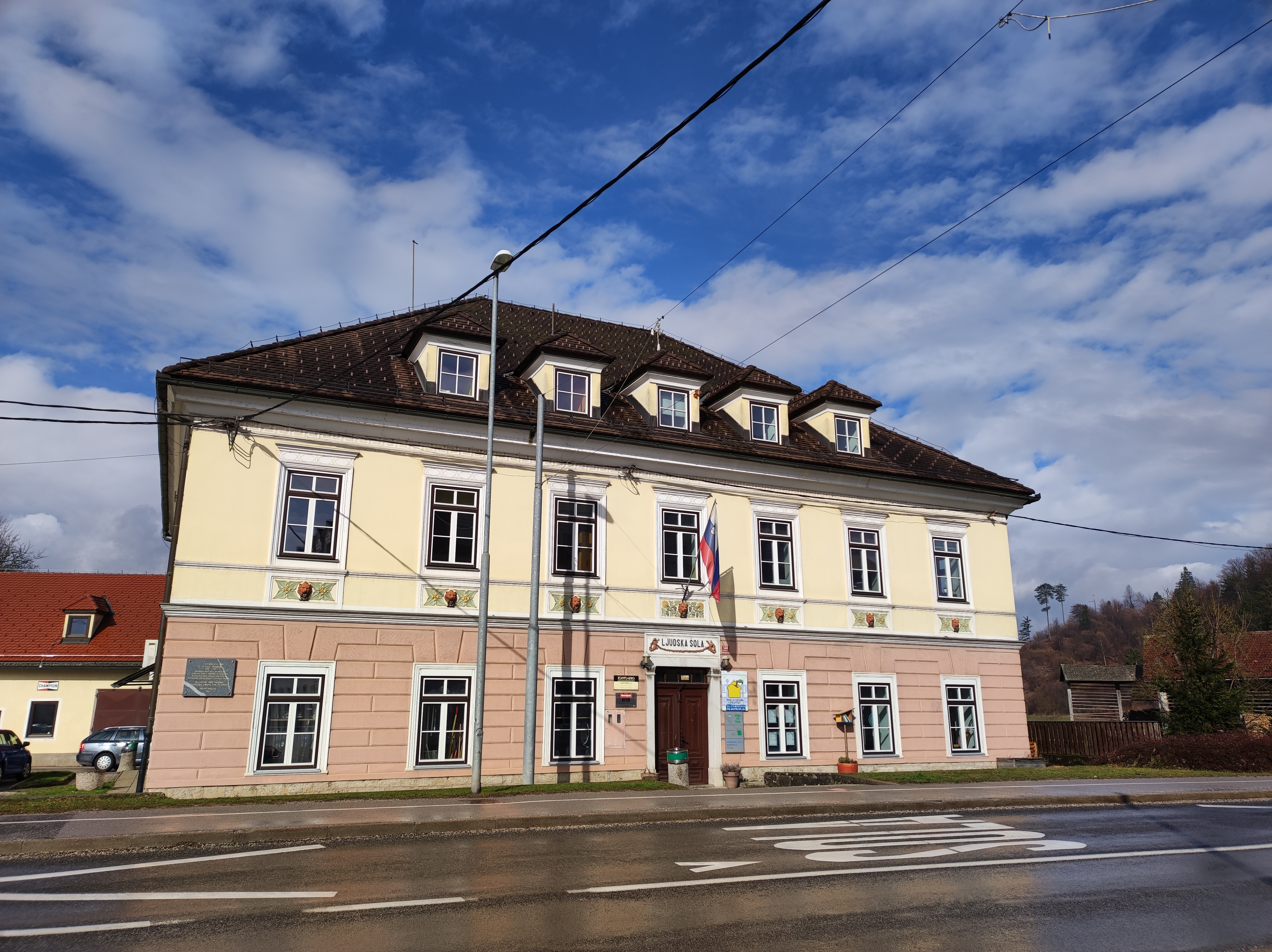
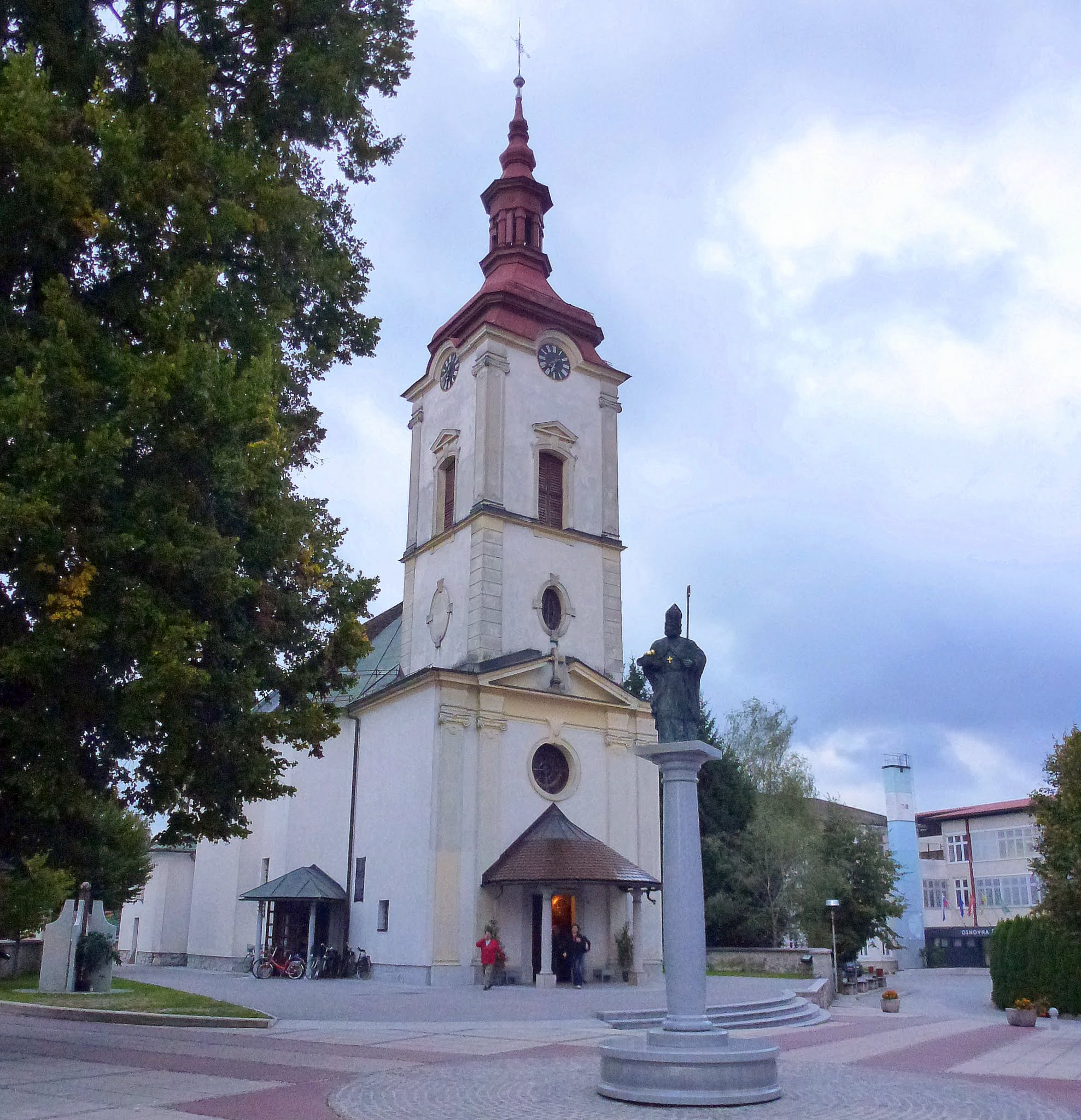
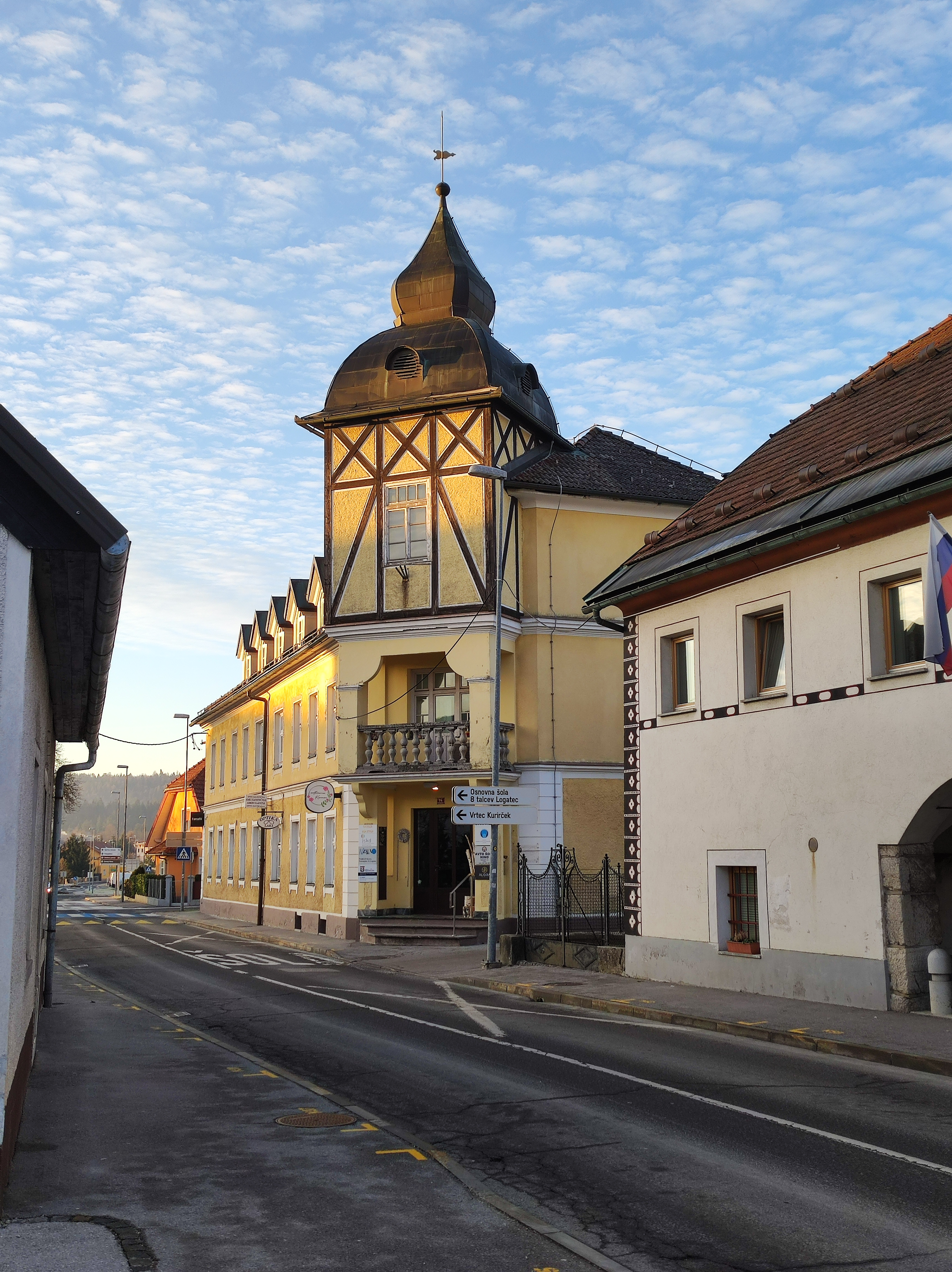
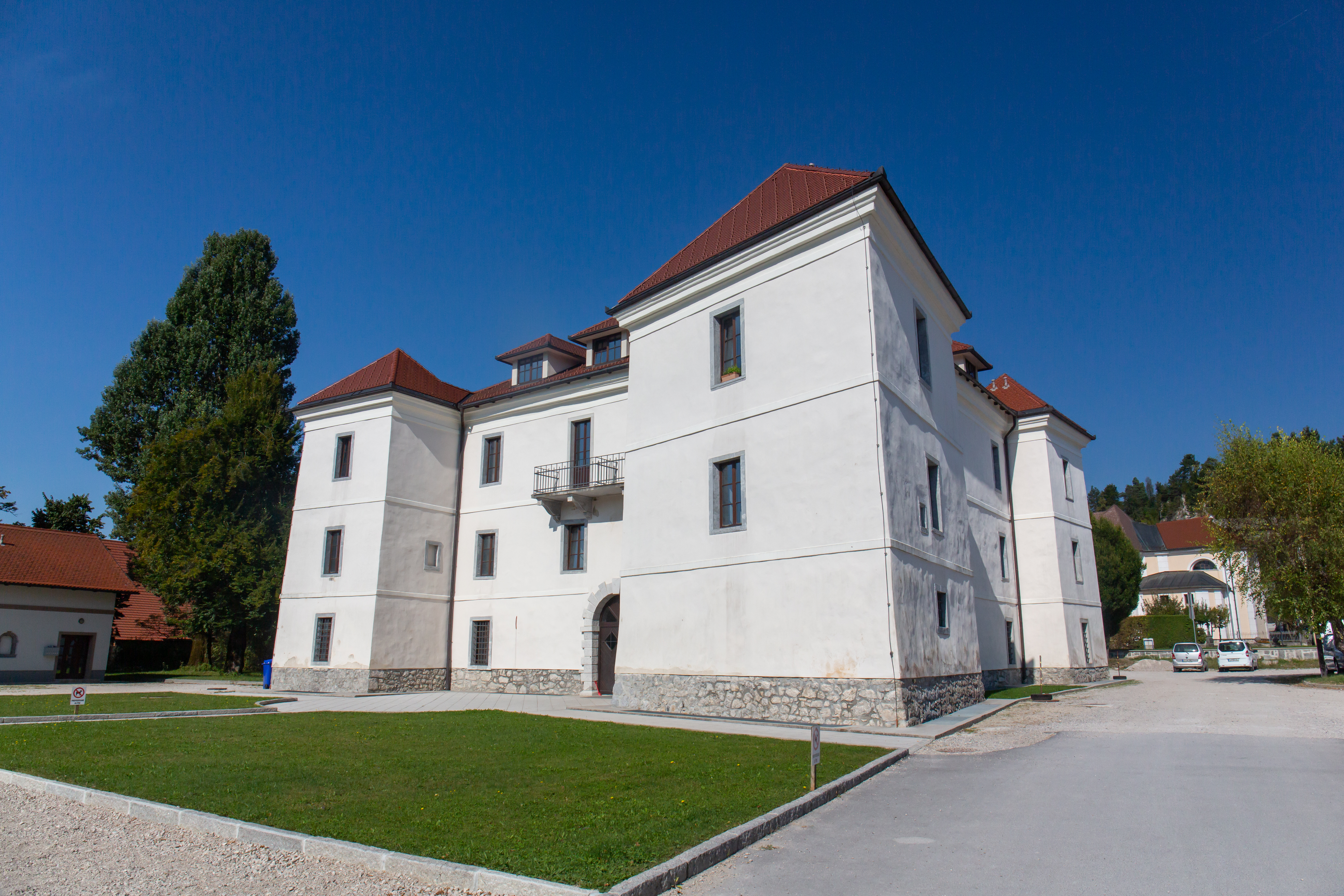
- From top, left to right: Panorama of the town, Old kindergarten, Old school, St. Nicholas' Church, Old Town Hall and rectory, Logatec Castle

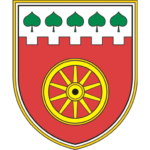
- Coat of arms

- Location in Slovenia
- Coordinates: 45°55′0.13″N 14°13′47.02″E
- Country: Slovenia
- Traditional region: Inner Carniola
- Statistical region: Central Slovenia
- Municipality: Logatec

Area
  - Total: 39.50 km^{2} (15.25 sq mi)
- Elevation: 476.5 m (1,563 ft)

Population (2023)
  - Total: 10.211
- Vehicle registration: LJ
- Climate: Cfb

Logatec (pronounced [lɔˈɡáːtəts]; German: Loitsch, Italian: Longatico) is a town in Slovenia. It is the seat of the Municipality of Logatec. It is located roughly in the centre of Inner Carniola, between the capital Ljubljana and Postojna. The town of Logatec has seen rapid industrial development and immigration since the completion of the nearby A1 motorway to the coast.

== Name ==
The name Logatec is of Celtic origin, probably derived from Celtic *longatis 'ferryman, boatman', from the Proto-Celtic word *longā 'ship', thus meaning 'ferrymen's settlement'. The name became Longaticum in Latin, which was borrowed into Slavic as *Lǫgatьcь. Early attestations of the Slavic name include Logach in 1265 (and Logatzc in 1296, Logatsch in 1307, Logacz in 1319, and de Logas in 1354).

== History ==
The earliest mentions of the settlement are from Roman times (Roman way station Mansio Longatico). The vicinity of trade routes between the interior and the coast has always played an important part in the region. First the Roman road from Aquileia to Emona, and later the road to Trieste and the Southern Railway. Before the construction of railway line, the majority of the population made a living as teamsters.

The town of Logatec was formed by combining a number of former villages:

- Blekova Vas (Blekova vas, German: Fleckdorf)
- Brod. The name of the settlement was changed from Brod to Brod–Logatec in 1955. It was joined to Logatec in 1972.
- Čevica (German: Tscheuze), joined to Logatec in 1972.
- Dolenja Vas (Slovene: Dolenja vas)
- Dolenji Logatec (German: Unterloitsch), joined to Logatec in 1972.
- Gorenja Vas (Slovene: Gorenja vas, German: Oberdorf). The name of the settlement was changed from Gorenja vas to Gorenja vas pod Režišami in 1953. It was joined to Logatec in 1972.
- Gorenji Logatec (German: Oberloitsch), formerly Cerkovska Vas (German: Kirchdorf), joined to Logatec in 1972.
- Mandrge
- Martinj Hrib, joined to Logatec in 1972.

The town's brass band was founded in 1913.

=== Mass graves ===
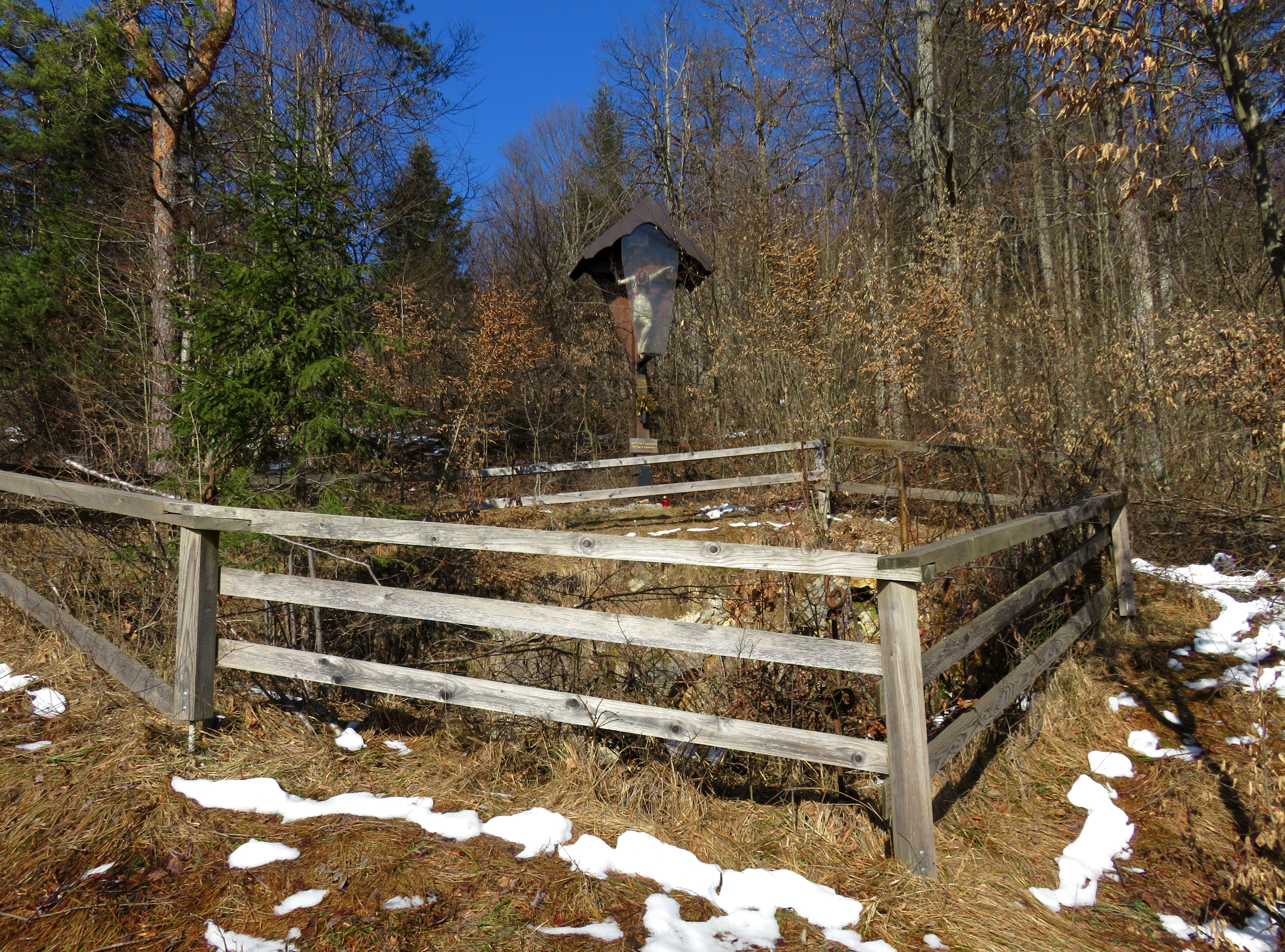
The Šemon Shaft Mass Grave

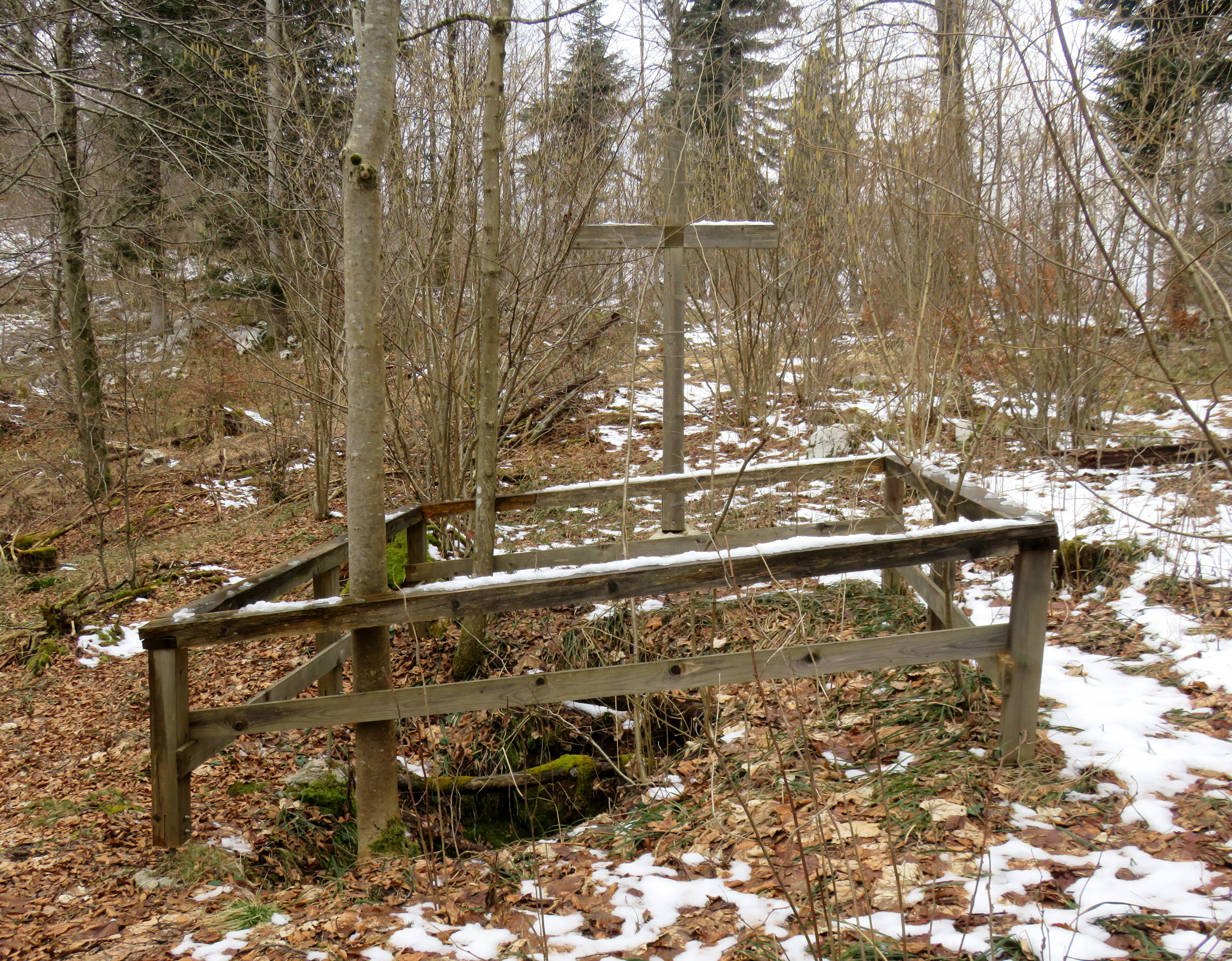
The Košovec Shaft Mass Grave

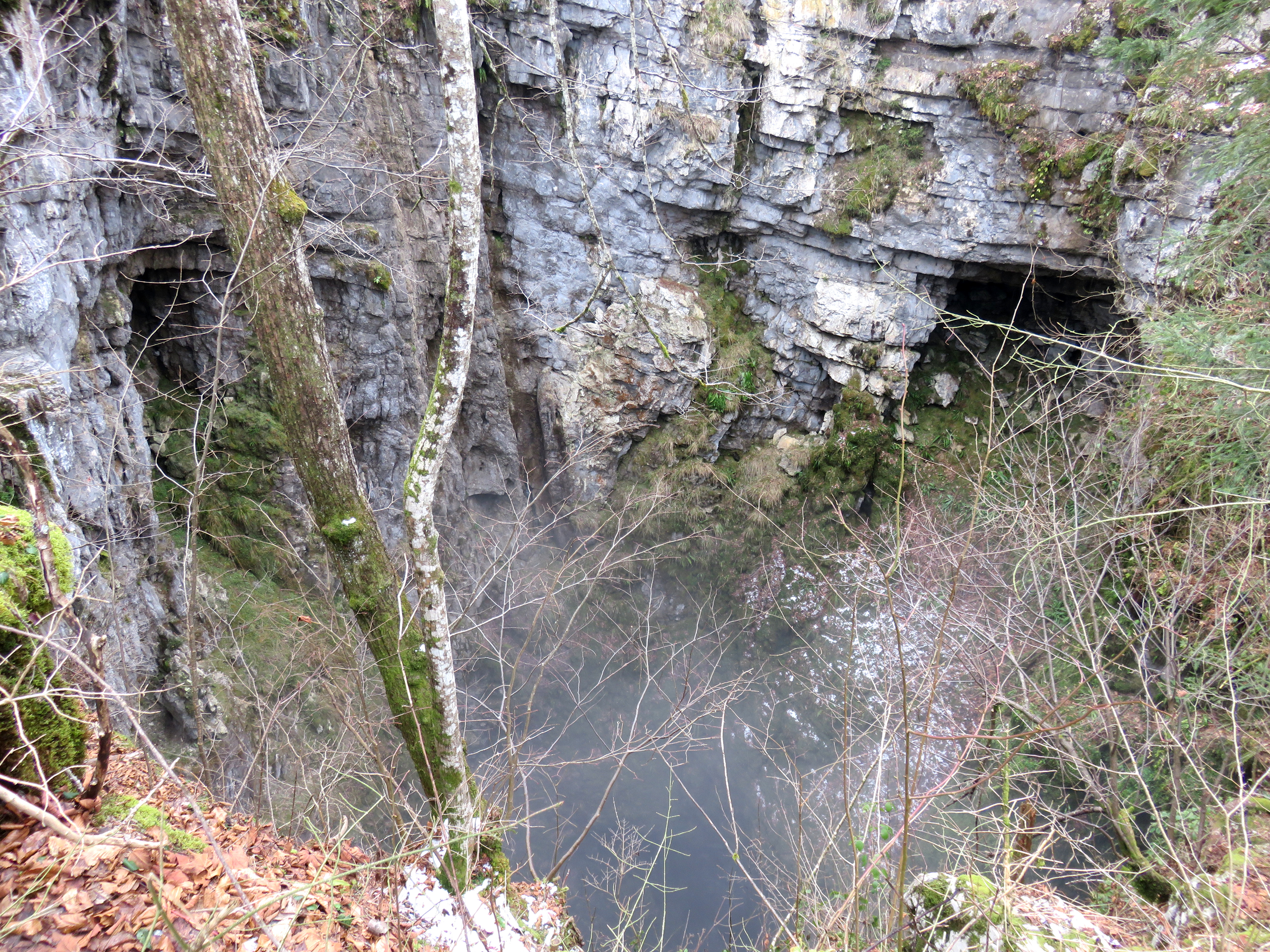
The Gradišnica Cave Mass Grave

Mass graves in Logatec

Logatec is the site of three known mass graves from during or after the Second World War. The Šemon Shaft Mass Grave (Slovene: Grobišče Šemonovo brezno) lies on the southern slope of Strmica Hill north of the town. The entrance to the 27-meter (89 ft) shaft is marked by two pine trees. The grave contains the remains of civilians from the nearby village of Rovte that were murdered in May or June 1945. The Košovec Shaft Mass Grave (Grobišče Brezno na Košovcu) is a 45-meter (148 ft) shaft located in the middle of a woods about 2 kilometers (1.2 mi) south of Logatec. In addition to human remains, investigators have found German identification tags, gold dentures, a ring, ammunition, and remains of military and civilian footwear in the shaft. The Gradišnica Cave Mass Grave (Grobišče Jama Gradišnica) lies south of Logatec. It contains the remains of two to five unknown victims.

== Climate ==
Climate data for Logatec (1991–2020 normals, extremes 1950–2020)
Month	Jan	Feb	Mar	Apr	May	Jun	Jul	Aug	Sep	Oct	Nov	Dec	Year
Record high °C (°F)	15.9 (60.6)	19.3 (66.7)	23.8 (74.8)	26.7 (80.1)	31.7 (89.1)	35.5 (95.9)	35.9 (96.6)	37.0 (98.6)	31.6 (88.9)	26.4 (79.5)	21.4 (70.5)	15.7 (60.3)	37.0 (98.6)
Mean daily maximum °C (°F)	3.5 (38.3)	5.6 (42.1)	10.2 (50.4)	14.9 (58.8)	19.7 (67.5)	23.7 (74.7)	25.8 (78.4)	25.5 (77.9)	19.8 (67.6)	14.5 (58.1)	8.7 (47.7)	4.0 (39.2)	14.7 (58.5)
Daily mean °C (°F)	−0.6 (30.9)	0.2 (32.4)	3.9 (39.0)	8.3 (46.9)	13.1 (55.6)	17.1 (62.8)	18.7 (65.7)	18.0 (64.4)	13.2 (55.8)	9.1 (48.4)	4.7 (40.5)	0.0 (32.0)	8.8 (47.8)
Mean daily minimum °C (°F)	−4.6 (23.7)	−4.3 (24.3)	−1.2 (29.8)	2.3 (36.1)	6.6 (43.9)	10.4 (50.7)	11.8 (53.2)	11.8 (53.2)	8.2 (46.8)	5.0 (41.0)	1.4 (34.5)	−3.6 (25.5)	3.6 (38.5)
Record low °C (°F)	−26.7 (−16.1)	−29.9 (−21.8)	−23.5 (−10.3)	−10.1 (13.8)	−6.5 (20.3)	−2.2 (28.0)	2.1 (35.8)	0.5 (32.9)	−5.7 (21.7)	−9.8 (14.4)	−18.8 (−1.8)	−22.4 (−8.3)	−29.9 (−21.8)
Average precipitation mm (inches)	113 (4.4)	135 (5.3)	132 (5.2)	128 (5.0)	135 (5.3)	136 (5.4)	126 (5.0)	125 (4.9)	184 (7.2)	178 (7.0)	210 (8.3)	184 (7.2)	1,786 (70.3)
Average precipitation days (≥ 0.1 mm)	12	11	11	13	14	13	11	11	12	13	15	14	150
Source: Slovenian Environment Agency

== Churches ==
Because Logatec is made of what were originally separate settlements, there are a number of churches in what is now the town. The parish church is in the Dolenji Logatec area and is dedicated to Saint Nicholas. It was first mentioned in written documents dating to 1526. From 1795 to 1803 a new church was built on the site. The church in the Čevica area is dedicated to Saint Joseph, and in Gorenji Logatec to the Virgin Mary.

== Gallery ==
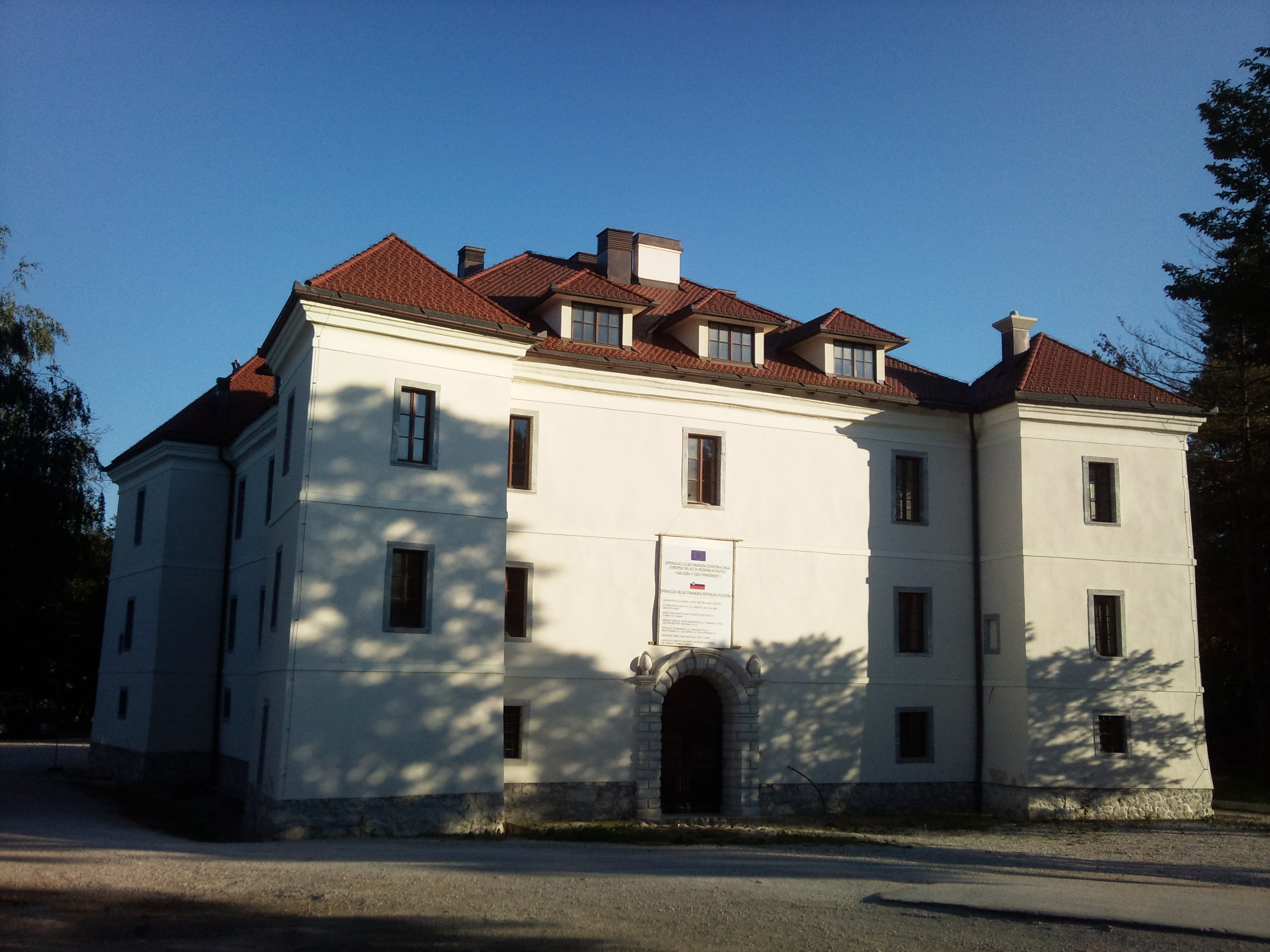
Logatec Castle
