= Gorenje Selce =

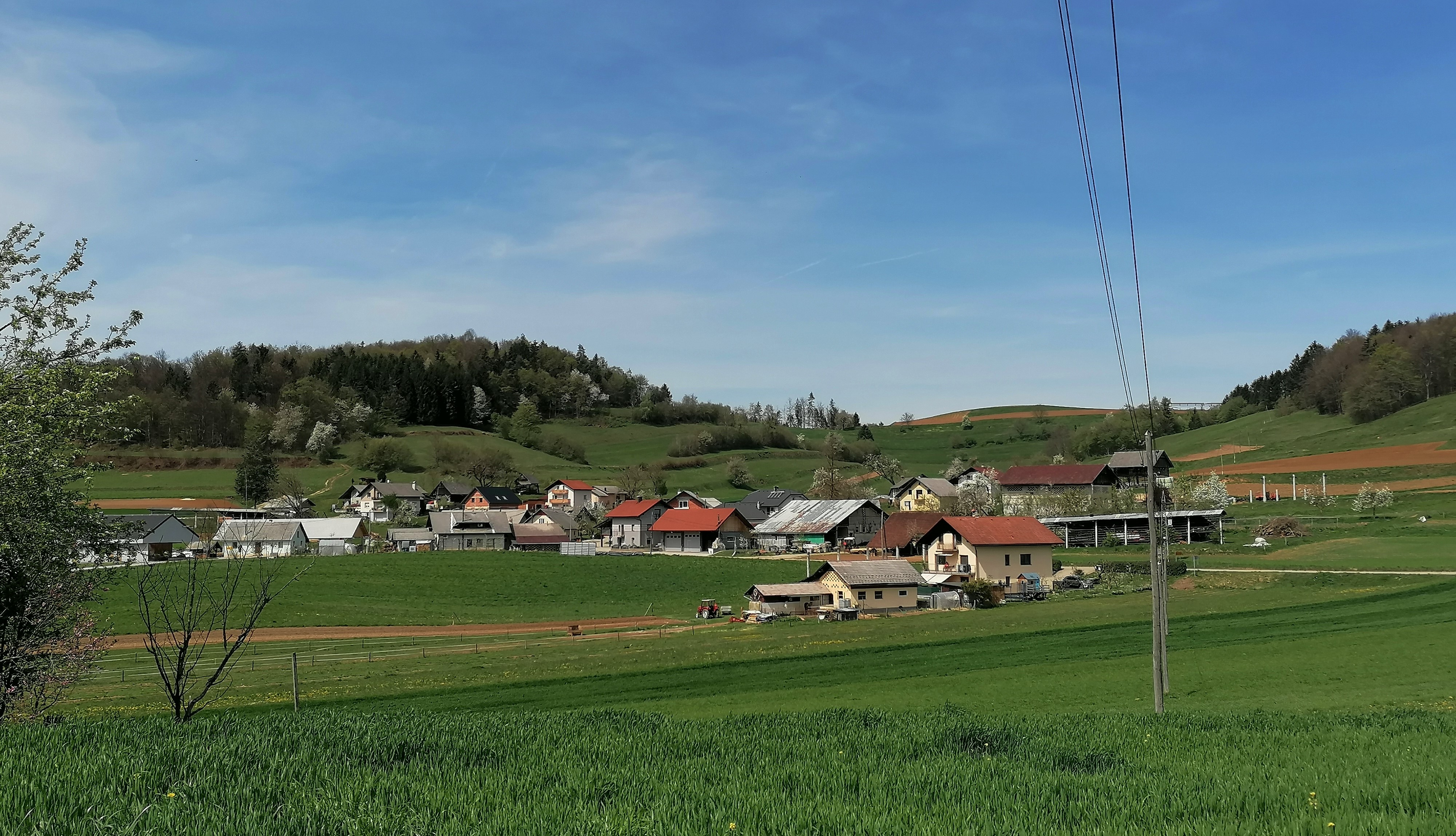

- Location in Slovenia
- Coordinates: 45°54′3.93″N 14°56′6.6″E
- Country: Slovenia
- Traditional region: Lower Carniola
- Statistical region: Southeast Slovenia
- Municipality: Trebnje

Area
  - Total: 0.99 km^{2} (0.38 sq mi)
- Elevation: 335 m (1,099 ft)

Population (2002)
  - Total: 68

Gorenje Selce (pronounced [ɡɔˈɾeːnjɛ ˈsɛːu̯tsɛ]) is a small settlement in the Municipality of Trebnje in eastern Slovenia. It lies just north of Dolenje Selce and west of Knežja Vas. The area is part of the historical region of Lower Carniola. The municipality is now included in the Southeast Slovenia Statistical Region.
