= Minka (disambiguation) =

Minka (民家 literally "peasant house") is a type of Japanese house.

Minka may also refer to:

== People ==
- Henri Pierre Armand Nnouck Minka (born 1984), Cameroonian footballer
- Minka Govekar (1874–1950), Slovene teacher and campaigner for women's rights
- Minka Pradelski (born 1947) German sociologist
- Minka Kelly (born 1980), American actress
- Minka Yady Camara (born 1989), Guinean footballer

== Other ==
- Minka (communal work) or mink'a, a form of communal work first used during the Inca Empire
- Minka, Queensland, Australia
- Minka Bird, a native Australian mythological creature
- "Ikhav Kozak za Dunaj", Ukrainian folk tune, known in German as "Schöne Minka"
- Minka (film) 1995 short film by Guinean director Mohamed Camara
- Minka, a character in the 1887 opera Le roi malgré lui
- Minka Mark, a spider monkey from the 2012 children’s show Littlest Pet Shop

== See also ==
- Minkah Fitzpatrick (born 1996), American football player in the NFL
