= Kozjak, Trebnje =

Kozjak
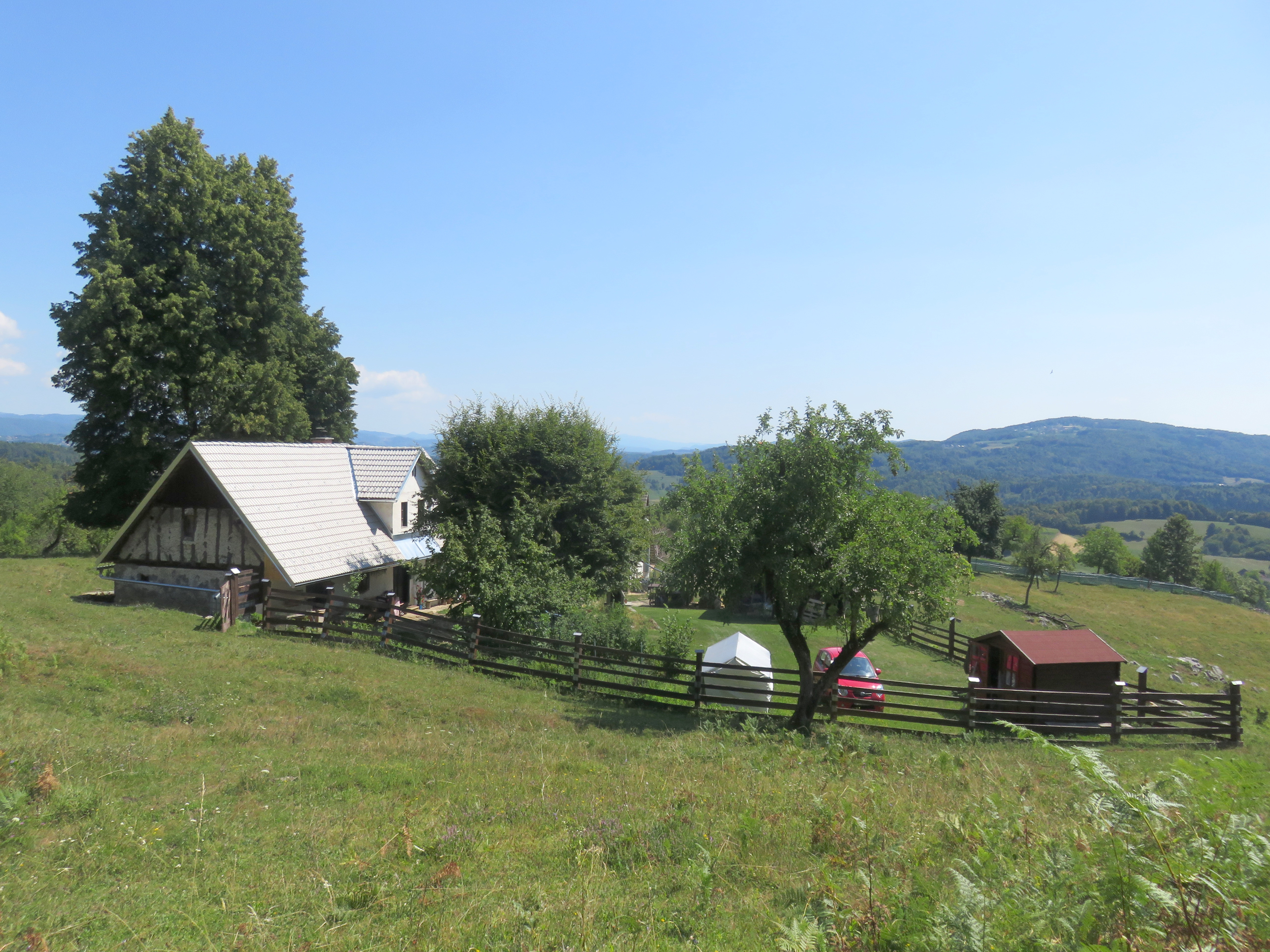

- Location in Slovenia
- Coordinates: 45°53′33″N 14°55′46″E
- Country: Slovenia
- Traditional region: Lower Carniola
- Statistical region: Southeast Slovenia
- Municipality: Trebnje
- Elevation: 380 m (1,250 ft)

Kozjak (pronounced [ˈkoːzjak], sometimes Kozjek, German: Kosiek) is a former village in eastern Slovenia in the Municipality of Trebnje. Since 1955 it has been part of the village of Dolenje Selce. It is located in the traditional region of Lower Carniola and is now included in the Southeast Slovenia Statistical Region.

== Geography ==
Kozjak is located southwest of the village center of Dolenje Selce. It is connected by road to Gorenje Kamenje pri Dobrniču. Kozjek Hill (elevation: 456 meters or 1,496 feet) rises northwest of the settlement.

== Name ==
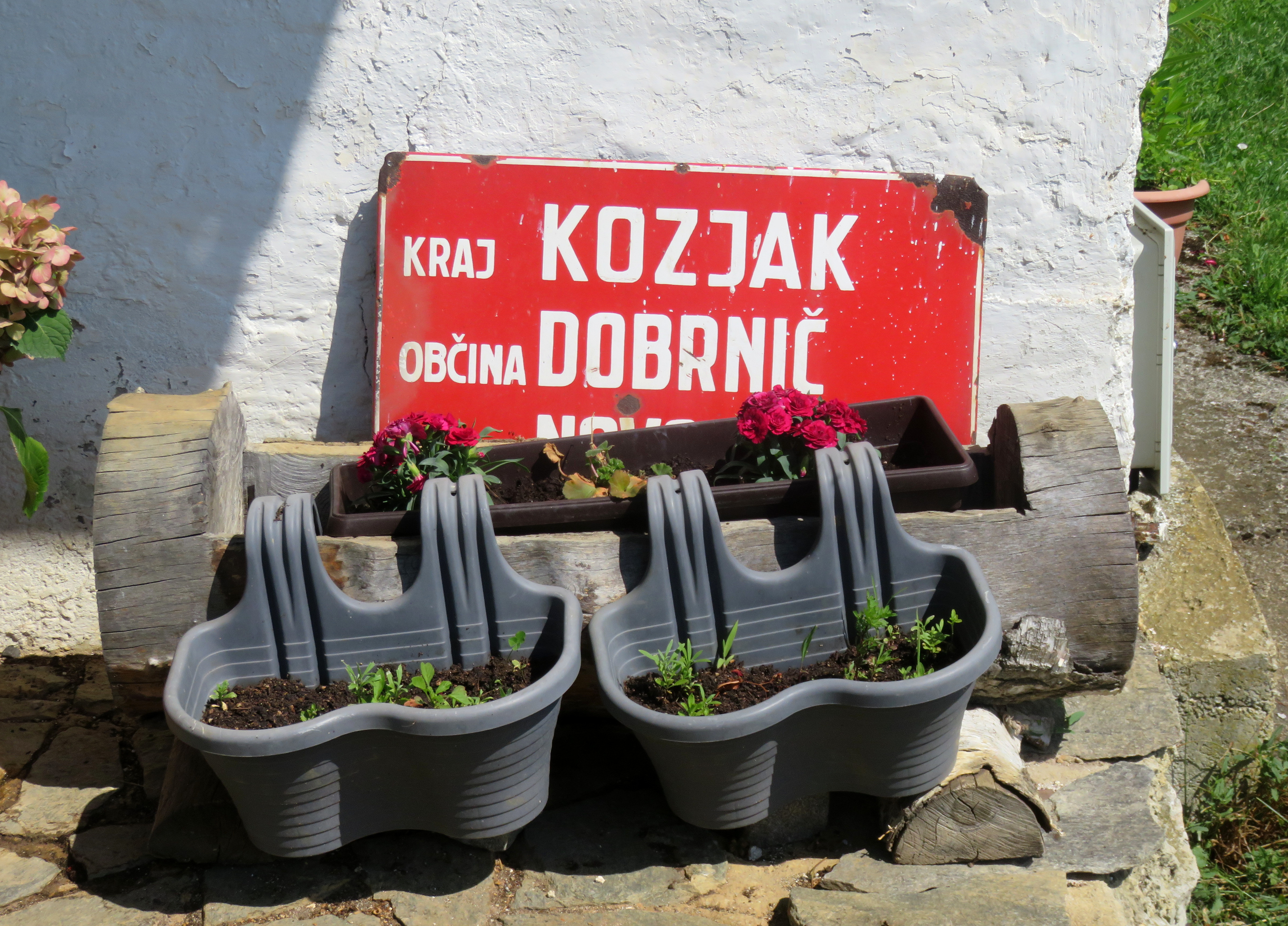
A village sign for Kozjak

The name Kozjak appears in several locations in Slovenia. It is derived from the common noun koza 'goat', but the motivation is unclear; it may refer to goats that grazed in the area, or the resemblance of a local topographical feature to a goat's back.

== History ==
On the summit of Kozjek Hill there are the ruins of a castle; it was mentioned in written documents in 1274 and it still stood in the 17th century, when it was acquired by the Auersperg family. The Counts of Saurer, who shielded Protestants during the Reformation, were among the earlier owners of the castle. Josip Jurčič's 1864 story Jurij Kozjak, slovenski janičar ('Jurij Kozjak, a Slovene Janissary') is connected with the location.

Kozjak was annexed by Dolenje Selce in 1955, ending its existence as a separate settlement.
