= Kozjak Castle =

Castle ruin near Trebnje, Slovenia

Coordinates: 45°53′35.43″N 14°55′39.16″E

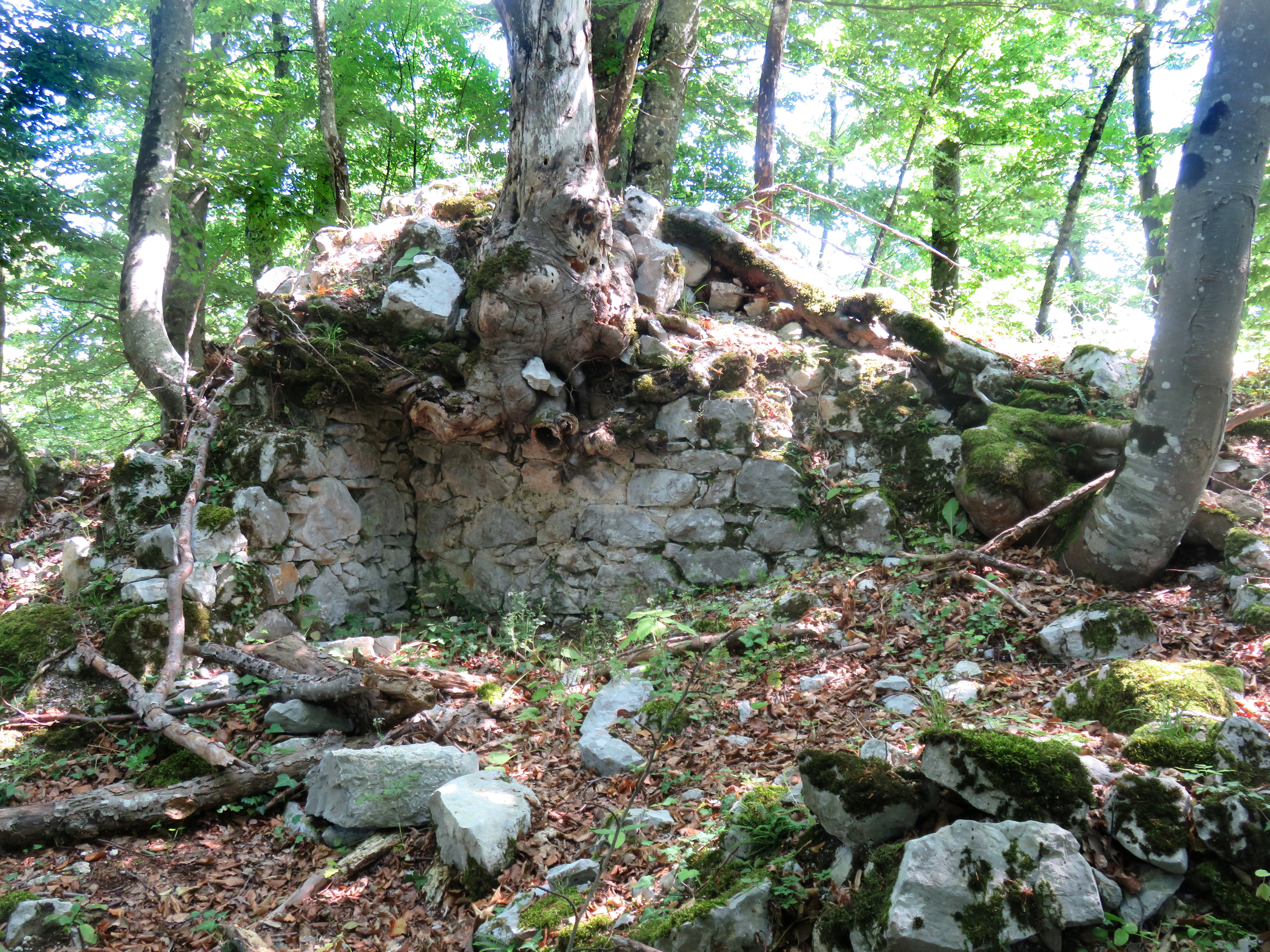
Ruins of Kozjak Castle

Kozjak Castle (Slovene: Grad Kozjak, German: Schloss Kosieck) is a 13th-century castle ruin on a rocky hill above the village of Dolenje Selce near the town of Dobrnič, part of the Municipality of Trebnje in Lower Carniola, Slovenia.

== History ==
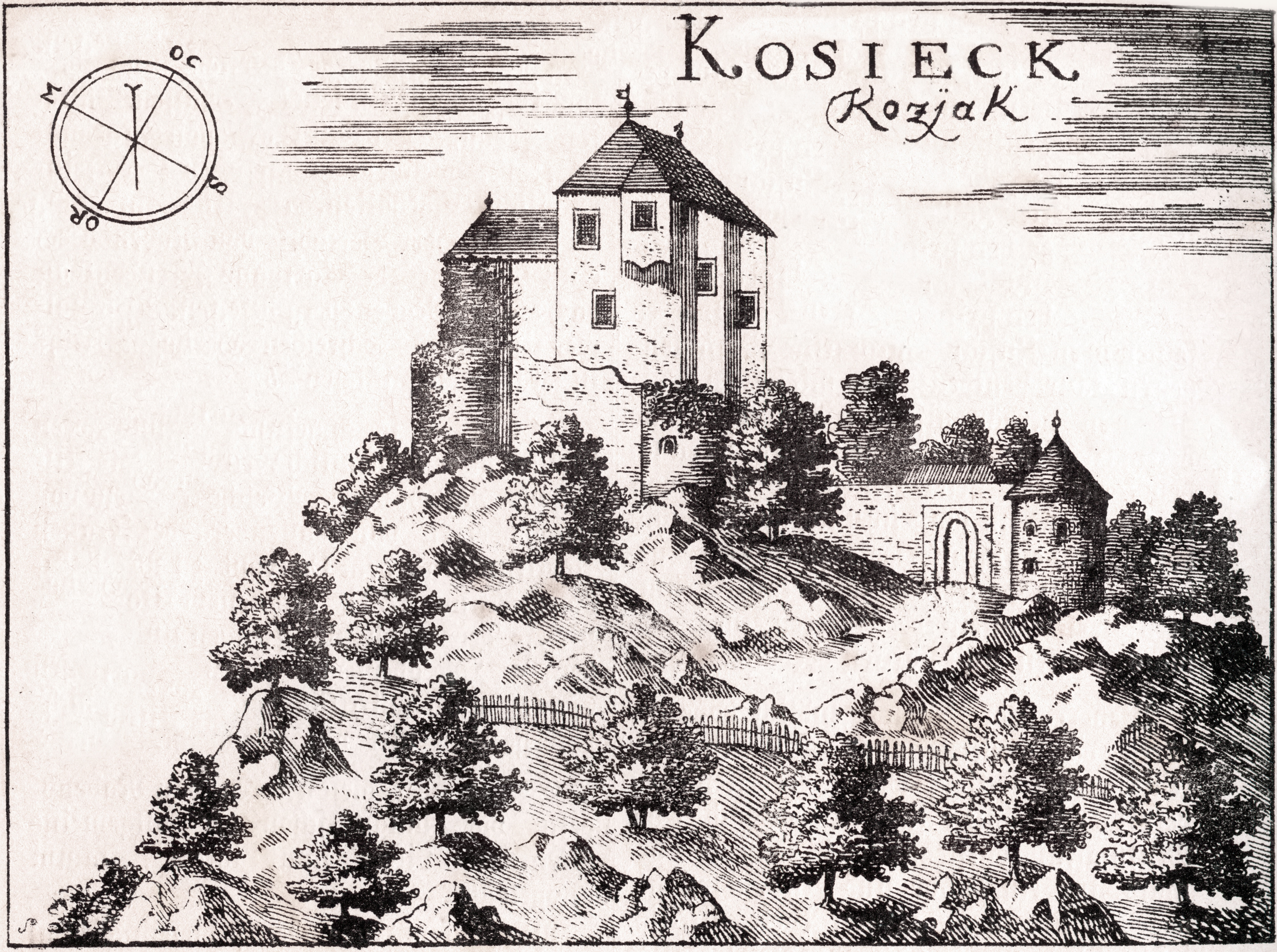
Kozjak Castle depicted in 1689

Built after 1250, the castle itself was first mentioned only in 1332 (in Latin) as castrum Cozyak, although the historian Johann Weikhard von Valvasor notes that a knight Ulrik of Kosieck must have already been the owner of the castle in 1274. Initially, the area was part of the lordship of Šumberk; after the Counts of Gorizia had the castle built, it became the home of the knights of Kosieck and a separate lordship of Kozjak was established around it. After the death of Ulrik of Kosieck in 1317, Ortolf of Kosieck became the owner of the castle until 1329. The last native lord of Kozjak was - according to Valvasor - Louis of Kosieck, who was in 1475 captured by the Turks. Though his family ransomed him after a year for the sum of 2000 guilders, he died soon after his return, having allegedly been poisoned by his captors.

After the extinction of the house, the castle was inherited by the Kosieck's relatives the Sauer family. The first known owner of this house was Pancratius Sauer, owner between 1540 and 1550, followed by his son George Sauer between 1555 and 1556, Jost Sauer in 1576, Jost and George Sauer in 1588, and Johann Louis Sauer between 1594 and 1599. After the tenure of the last Sauer, Franz, the castle was in 1611 bought by his brother-in-law Johann Frederik the noble Räuber, who in 1619 handed it over to his brother Johann Louis. Around 1689, the castle was bought by prince Franz Ferdinand Auersperg, who merged its estate with Šumberk. The castle was partially abandoned at the end of the 17th century, with the uninhabited sections allowed to decay; it is likely that the rest of it was not completely abandoned until the early 19th century. After World War II, Ivan Komelj described it only as a "completely overgrown pile of rocks."

Today, only a few outer walls and a central building survive reasonably intact, though the basic floorplan, including the remains of rooms and the foundations of towers, remains clearly visible.

== Architecture ==
The first known depiction of the castle is an etching in Valvasor's 1689 The Glory of the Duchy of Carniola, which portrays it as a two-story building of rectangular layout and with a sizeable extension on the south side. The east side features a prominent platform on raised piles. The castle was surrounded by external walls fortified with three towers.

== In literature ==
Kozjak Castle is a major setting of the book Jurij Kozjak by the Slovene writer Josip Jurčič, which includes descriptions of medieval castle life and its surroundings during the era of Ottoman incursions.

== References and sources ==
- Johann Weikhard von Valvasor, Die Ehre deß Hertzogthums Crain, vol. 11, p. 315.
- Majda Smole, Graščine na nekdanjem Kranjskem, p. 237
- Ivan Stopar, Grajske stavbe v osrednji Sloveniji, vol. 2: Dolenjska, part 3.: Porečje Temenice in Mirne - Viharnik, Ljubljana, 2002 ISBN 961-6057-34-0
