= Gorenje Medvedje Selo =

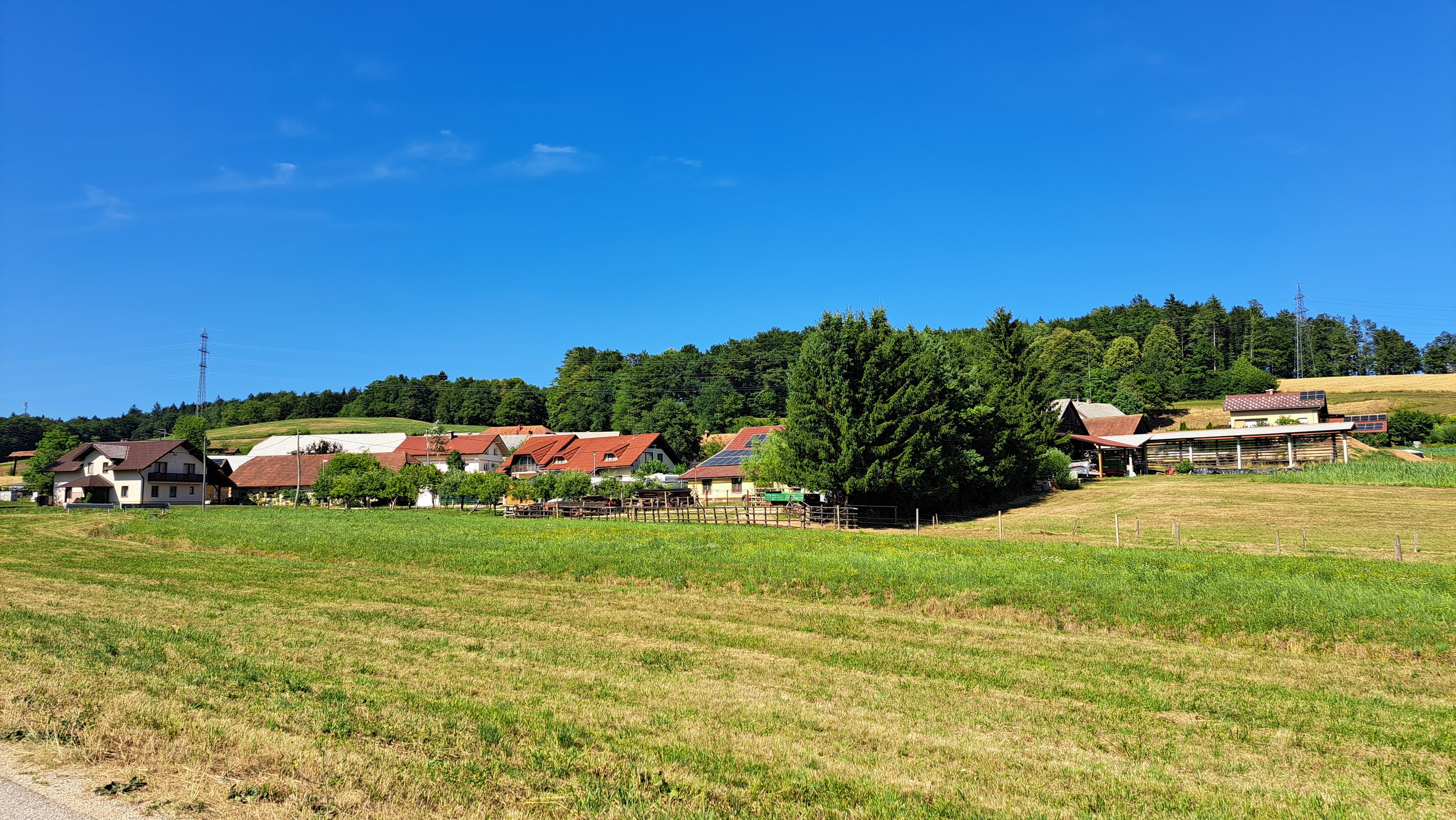

- Location in Slovenia
- Coordinates: 45°55′9.42″N 15°1′26.3″E
- Country: Slovenia
- Traditional region: Lower Carniola
- Statistical region: Southeast Slovenia
- Municipality: Trebnje

Area
  - Total: 0.97 km^{2} (0.37 sq mi)
- Elevation: 286.4 m (940 ft)

Population (2002)
  - Total: 40

Gorenje Medvedje Selo (pronounced [ɡɔˈɾeːnjɛ mɛˈdʋeːdjɛ ˈsɛːlɔ]; Slovene: Gorenje Medvedje selo) is a small settlement just north of Trebnje in eastern Slovenia. The Municipality of Trebnje lies in the historical region of Lower Carniola and is included in the Southeast Slovenia Statistical Region.
