= Pristava pri Trebnjem =

- Location in Slovenia
- Coordinates: 45°54′32″N 14°59′53″E
- Country: Slovenia
- Traditional region: Lower Carniola
- Statistical region: Southeast Slovenia
- Municipality: Trebnje
- Elevation: 278 m (912 ft)

Pristava pri Trebnjem (pronounced [pɾiˈstaːʋa pɾi ˈtɾeːbnjɛm], German: Pristawa (bei Treffen)) is a former village in eastern Slovenia in the Municipality of Trebnje. It is now part of the town of Trebnje. It is part of the traditional region of Lower Carniola and is now included in the Southeast Slovenia Statistical Region.

== Geography ==
Pristava pri Trebnjem stands west of the center of Trebnje. The houses in the settlement stand partially on a plain and partially on a terrace of the Temenica River above the railroad. There are tilled fields at higher elevations in the settlement and meadows at lower elevations near the river.

== Name ==
The name of the settlement was changed from Pristava to Pristava pri Trebnjem in 1953 in order to distinguish it from other settlements with the same name. The name Pristava pri Trebnjem literally means 'manor farm near Trebnje'. The name Pristava comes from the common noun pristava 'manor farm; house with outbuildings and land'. Manor farms were typically found near a manor house and were operated by servants of the manor. Settlements with this name and the semantically equivalent Marof are frequent in Slovenia.

== History ==
Archeological finds testify to settlement of the area during the Roman era. During excavation for new housing after the Second World War, Roman graves were found; they are believed to have been associated with the Roman colony of Praetorium Latobicorum.

Pristava pri Trebnjem was annexed by Trebnje in 1972, ending its existence as a separate settlement.
