= Antonija Höffern =

Slovenian noblewoman and educator (1803–1871)

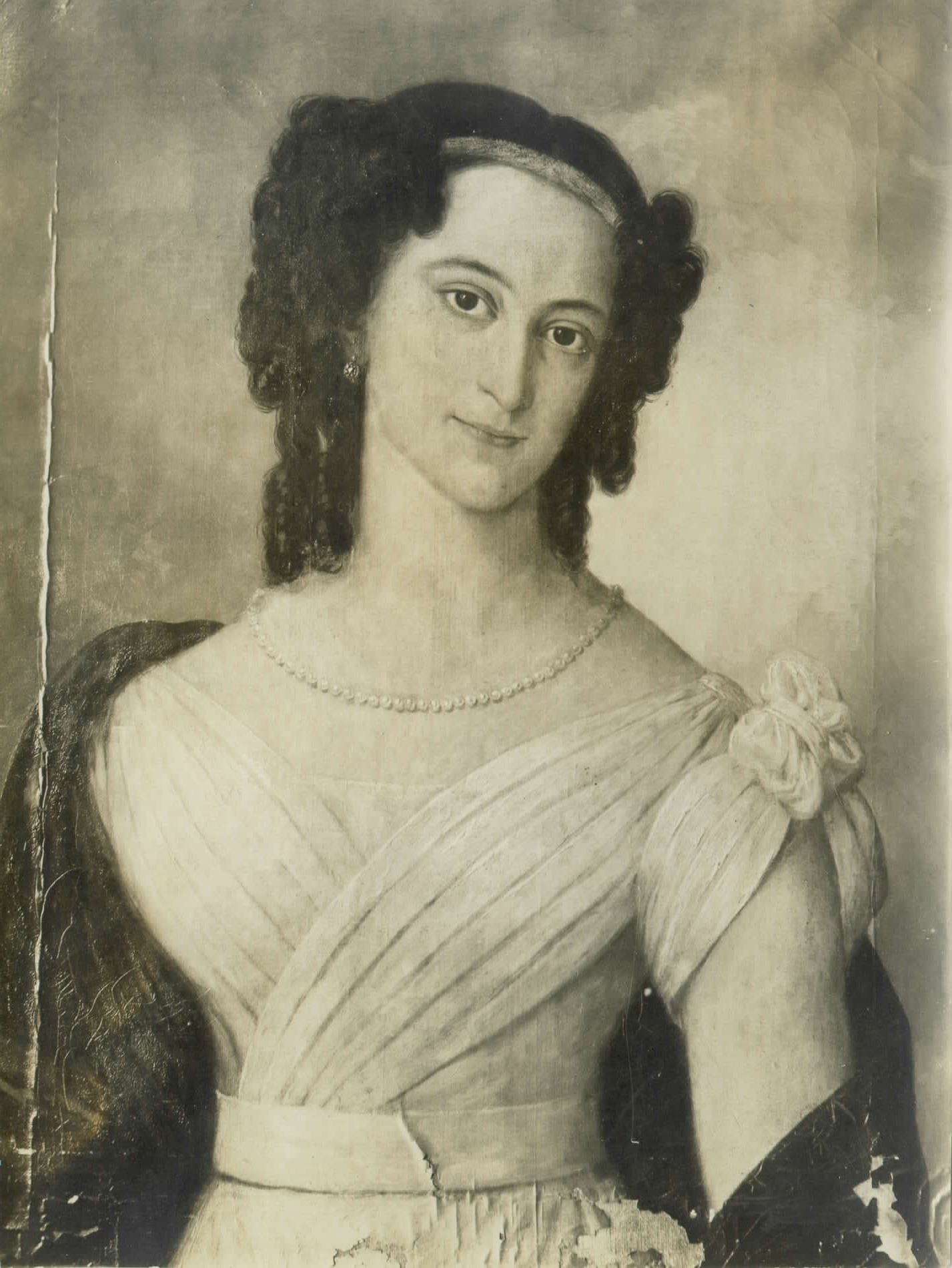
- Born: Antonija Baraga; 4 February 1803; Knežja Vas, Carniola, Austria
- Died: 21 May 1871 (aged 68); Ljubljana, Austria-Hungary
- Spouse: Feliks Höffern-Saalfeld (m. 1824; died 1830)
- Relatives: Frederic Baraga (brother)

Antonija Höffern (née Baraga; 4 February 1803 – 21 May 1871) was a Slovenian noblewoman and educator who is credited as being the first Slovenian woman to immigrate to the United States, doing so in 1837. After spending two years working as a missionary with the Ojibwe, she moved to Philadelphia, where she established an elite girls' school.

== Biography ==
Antonija Baraga was born on 4 February 1803 in the village of Knežja Vas in the Duchy of Carniola, now modern-day Slovenia. Her father was Janez Nepomuk Baraga, a minor noble and the caretaker of Mirna Castle, and her mother was Marija Katarina Jožefa. She spent her early life at Trebnje Castle, which had been owned by her father since 1799. Following the deaths of her parents in 1812, Baraga, her brother Frederic, and her sister Amalija, were adopted by prominent Ljubljana lawyer Jurij Dolinar, who was a family friend, and his wife Ana. Dolinar was a mentor to both Frederic and Antonija, ensuring that both were well-educated. She became fluent in five languages, while her brother began studying law in Vienna at Dolinar's recommendation.

Dolinar introduced her to financier Feliks Höffern-Saalfeld, and the couple were married on 31 May 1824 in the Ljubljana Cathedral. However, her husband died suddenly on 6 February 1830. According to the Slovenian Biographical Lexicon, she later became engaged to Matija Čop, a prominent writer, but he died after drowning in the Sava River on 6 July 1835. However, claims of this engagement are disputed: the Sunday Diary newspaper and the Slovenian Women's Union of America both suggest that she and Čop had broken up prior to his death, while writer Alojz Rebula doubted that they were ever engaged.

Beginning in 1830, her brother Frederic had been a missionary in the United States, working with the Ojibwe in the Great Lakes region. In 1837, while her brother was visiting Slovenia, Höffern decided to join him in America; she is considered to be the first Slovenian woman to immigrate to the United States. Travelling via Paris and New York, the siblings first moved to Mackinac Island in Michigan, and later to La Pointe in Wisconsin, embedding themselves with the Ojibwe. Höffern assisted her brother as a housekeeper, teacher, and lay missionary. During this period, she wrote several letters to her sister Amalija:

We left New York on the 5th of July and came to the glorious Hudson River with its friendly banks, where the wealthy New Yorkers have set up their docks, which surpass each other by different syllables. Here we had a quick and pleasant ride on the steamer. Ships meet on the Hudson, like carriages in Paris; it's really wonderful how Americans travel! Everywhere you see a lush country, everywhere a lively life, everywhere you have to marvel at the common sense of this excellent nation. So simple and so big, as big as a man!

— Regarding the United States

This waterfall makes a rainbow above it, which is seen by the sun and the moon; a thick cloud half obscures it; by the middle of the waterfall, the water is dark green because it is falling in such abundance. The landscape trembles far around, as if trembling with eternal fear. This place is often visited by foreigners, just like our baths.

— Regarding Niagara Falls

But our dear Friederik is so famous that everyone knows something to tell about him. I hear that they attribute to him superhuman things, which only a special favorite of God can do. There is not one among the Indians who does not know his name. These people are very greedy. Their appearance is handsome, their face pleasant, their eyes black and alive, the color is not red, as I imagined, but like that of half-guinea pigs. I often noticed Greek noses; their teeth are white and strong; the hair is as black as the eyes and never curly. Their figure is straight; they put their feet, which are as small as their hands, on the inside.

— Regarding the Ojibwe

Höffern struggled to adapt to living in the wilderness with the Ojibwe, having been "used to salon life". Her health began to fail, and she ultimately left her brother in 1839, settling in the city of Philadelphia. With the assistance of academics James C. Oehlschläger and Charles Minnigerode, Höffern established an elite girls' school in the city, the Ladies' Institute. The institute taught music, languages, and handicrafts. In 1854, due to financial issues, the school was forced to close, and Höffern moved back to Europe, settling in Rome, where she established another girls' school. In her later life, she returned to Ljubljana, living modestly until her death on 21 May 1871.

== Legacy ==
Höffern was portrayed by Vesna Pernarčič in the historical play ABC oder Krieg by Ivo Svetina. The play is about the literary circle her fiancée Čop was a member of in the 1830s.

The National and University Library of Slovenia collection contains a photo of her "Ojibwe deerskin moccasins".
