= Knežja Vas =

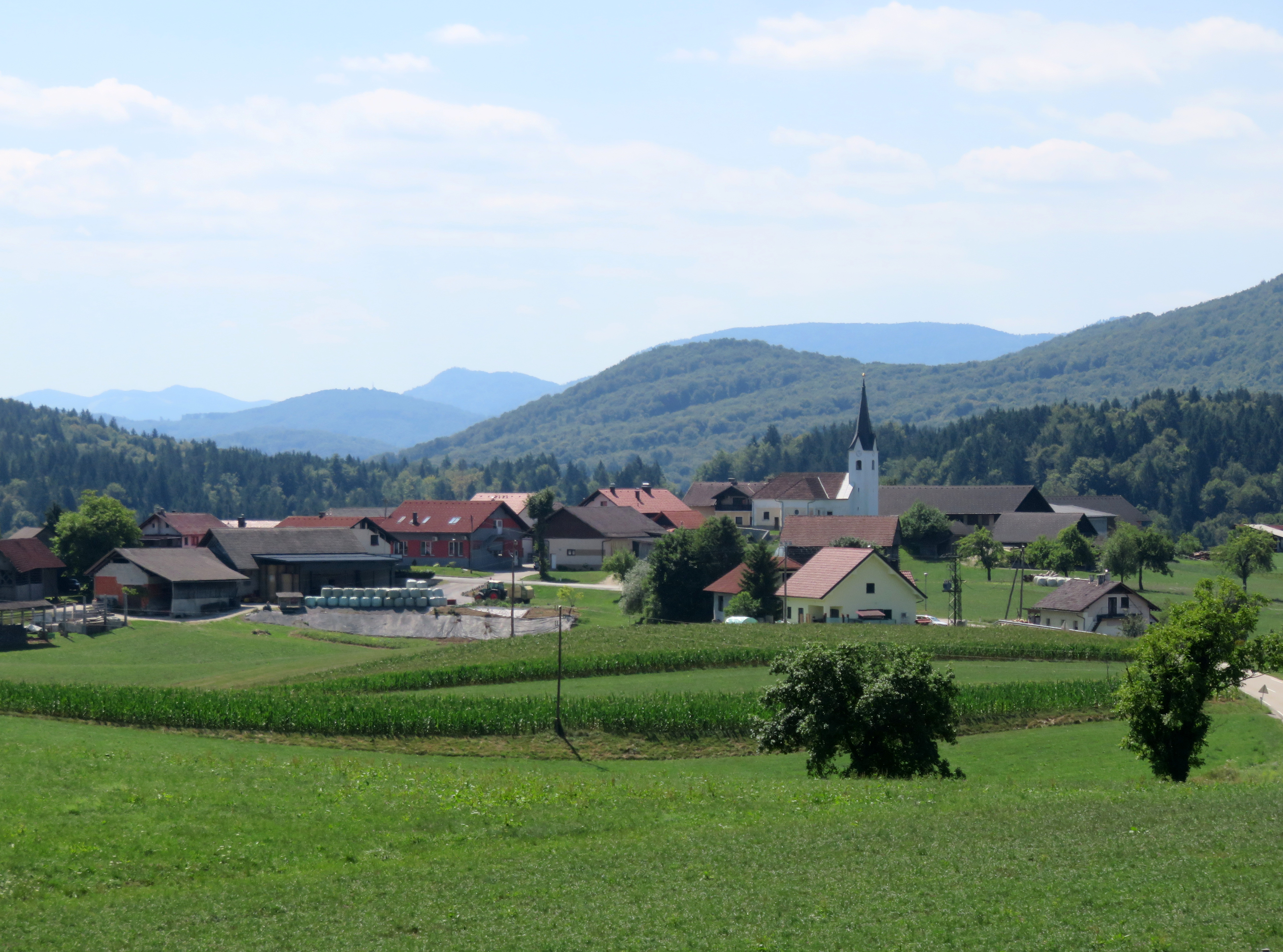

- Location in Slovenia
- Coordinates: 45°53′56.84″N 14°57′6.92″E
- Country: Slovenia
- Traditional region: Lower Carniola
- Statistical region: Southeast Slovenia
- Municipality: Trebnje

Area
  - Total: 1.97 km^{2} (0.76 sq mi)
- Elevation: 302.8 m (993 ft)

Population (2002)
  - Total: 73

Knežja Vas (pronounced [ˈkneːʒja ˈʋaːs]; Slovene: Knežja vas; German: Grafendorf) is a village in the Municipality of Trebnje in eastern Slovenia. The area is part of the historical region of Lower Carniola. The municipality is now included in the Southeast Slovenia Statistical Region.

== Name ==
The name Knežja vas literally means 'duke's village' and refers to feudal ownership of the settlement. Similar names in Slovenia with the same origin include Kneža, Knežak, and Knežina. The former German name of the village, Grafendorf (literally, 'count's village'), semantically corresponds to the Slovene name.

== Church ==
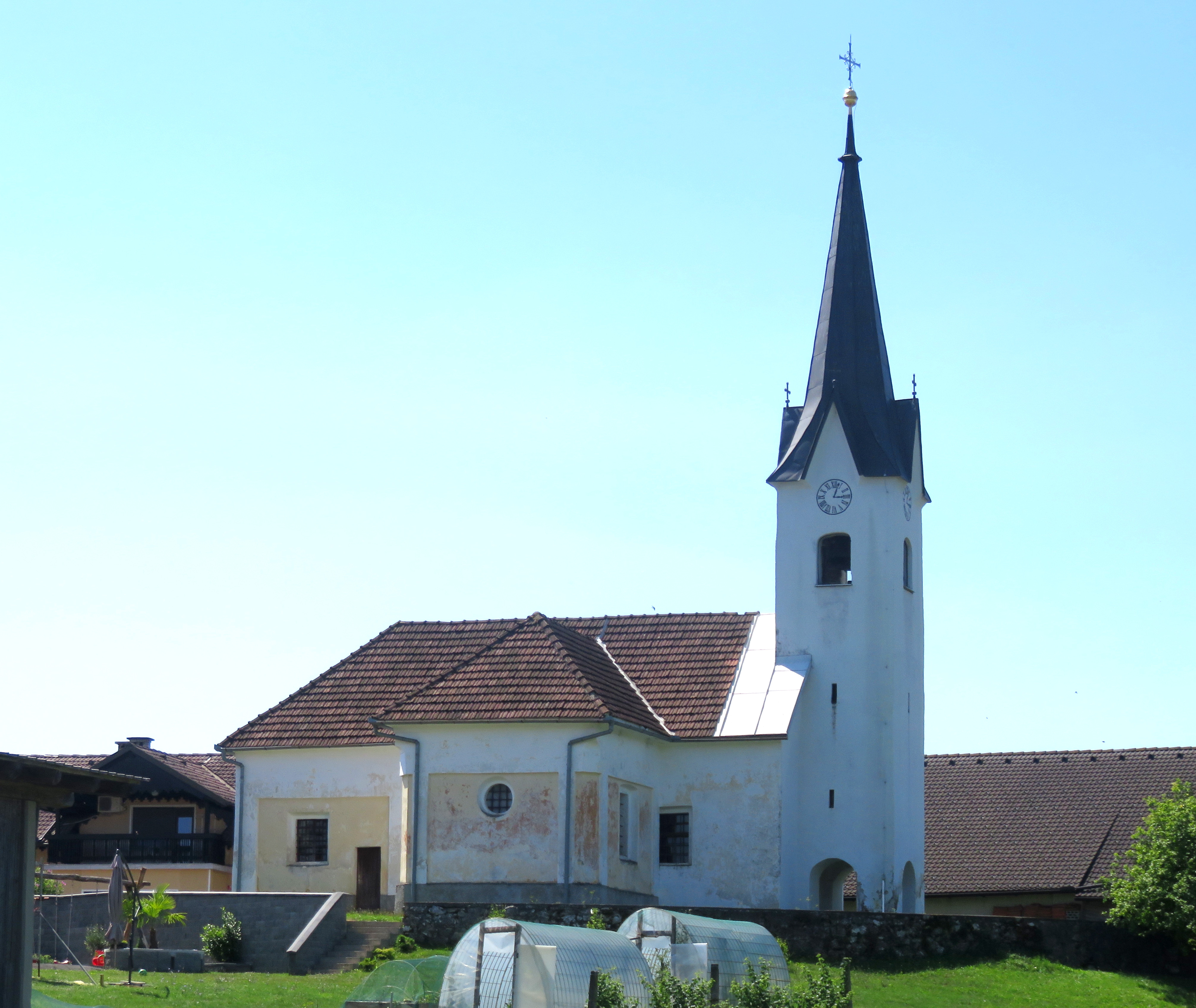
Saint Agnes's Church

The local church is dedicated to Saint Agnes and belongs to the Parish of Dobrnič. It was first mentioned in written documents dating to 1526.

== Notable people ==
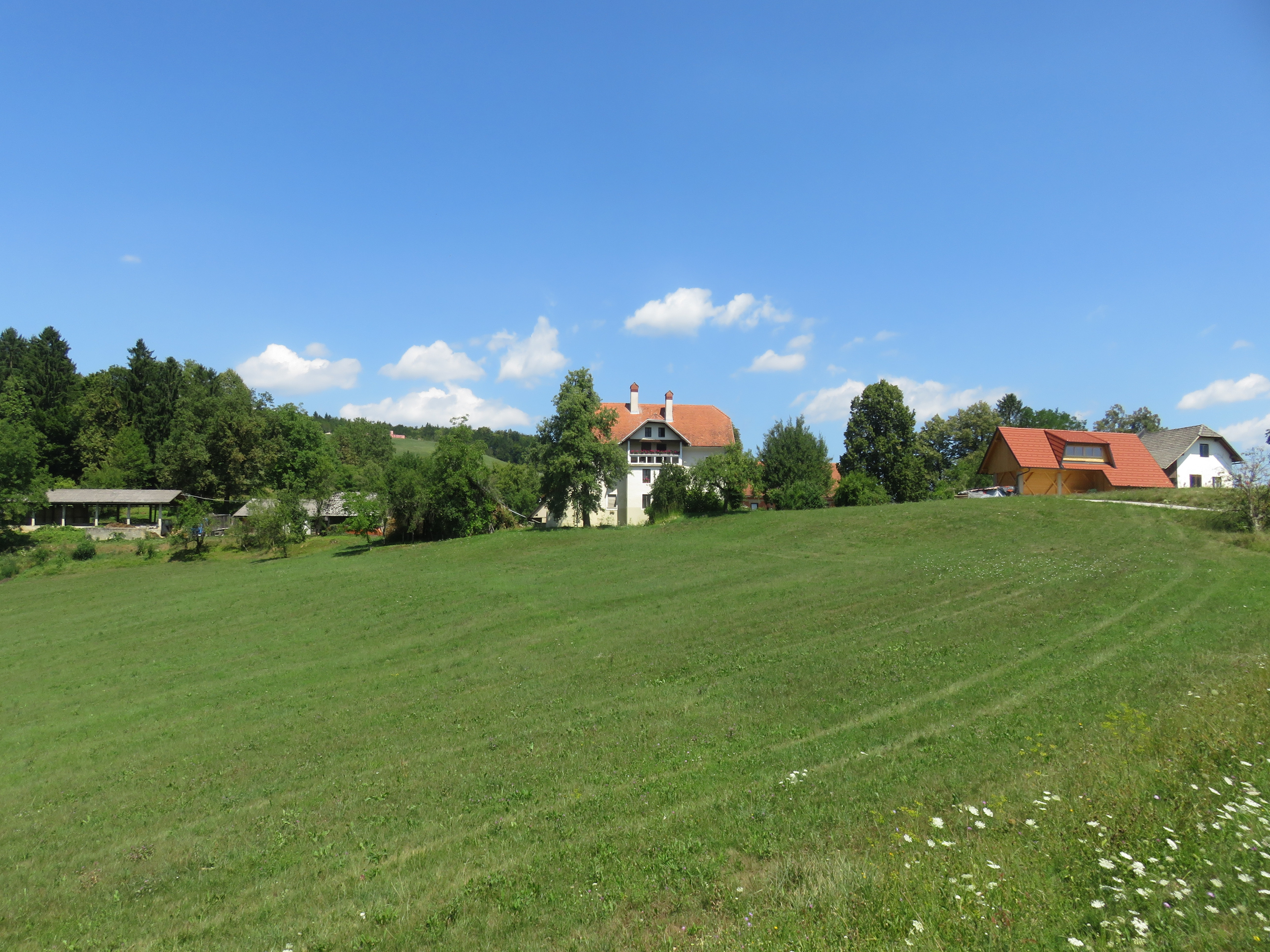
The hamlet of Mala Vas

In 1797 the Roman Catholic missionary, bishop, and grammarian Frederic Baraga was born in Mala Vas Manor in Mala Vas (Mala vas), which is now a hamlet in the northern part of Knežja Vas but was a separate settlement in the past. The 17th-century manor in which he was born houses a small museum dedicated to him. His sister Antonija Höffern was also born here on 4 February 1803.

On 10 or 11 April 1721 Maximillian Morautscher, a professor of physics in Laibach (now Ljubljana) and one of the founders of the Slovene Philharmonic Orchestra, was born in the same house. The building has been converted into a museum.
