= Gorenje Kamenje pri Dobrniču =

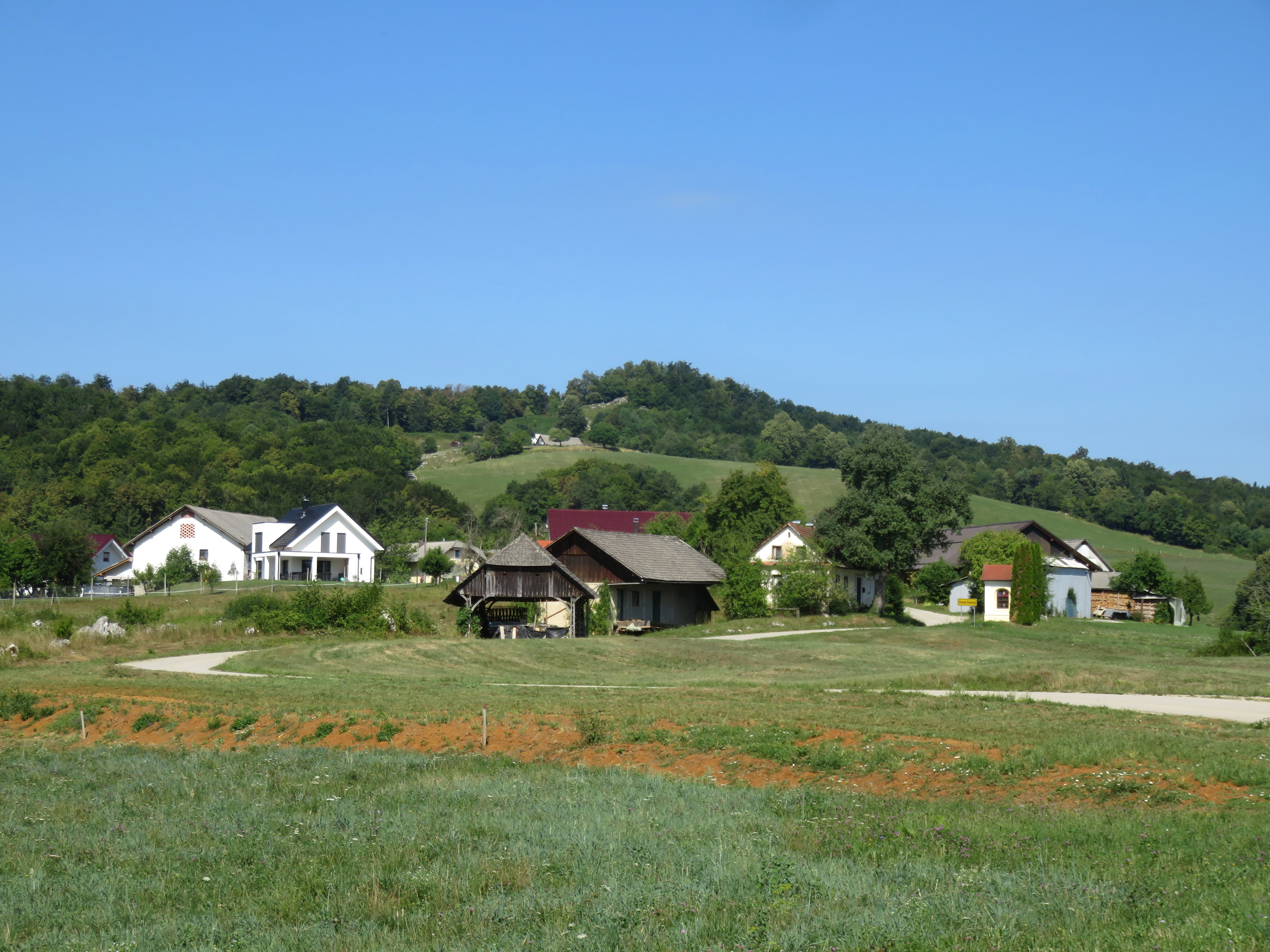

- Location in Slovenia
- Coordinates: 45°53′24.42″N 14°56′20.09″E
- Country: Slovenia
- Traditional region: Lower Carniola
- Statistical region: Southeast Slovenia
- Municipality: Trebnje

Area
  - Total: 1.32 km^{2} (0.51 sq mi)
- Elevation: 328.7 m (1,078 ft)

Population (2002)
  - Total: 46

Gorenje Kamenje pri Dobrniču (pronounced [ɡɔˈɾeːnjɛ ˈkaːmɛnjɛ pɾi ˈdoːbəɾnitʃu]) is a small settlement in the hills northwest of Dobrnič in the Municipality of Trebnje in eastern Slovenia. The area is part of the historical region of Lower Carniola. The municipality is now included in the Southeast Slovenia Statistical Region.

== Name ==
The name of the settlement was changed from Gorenje Kamenje to Gorenje Kamenje pri Dobrniču in 1953.
