= Dolenje Selce =

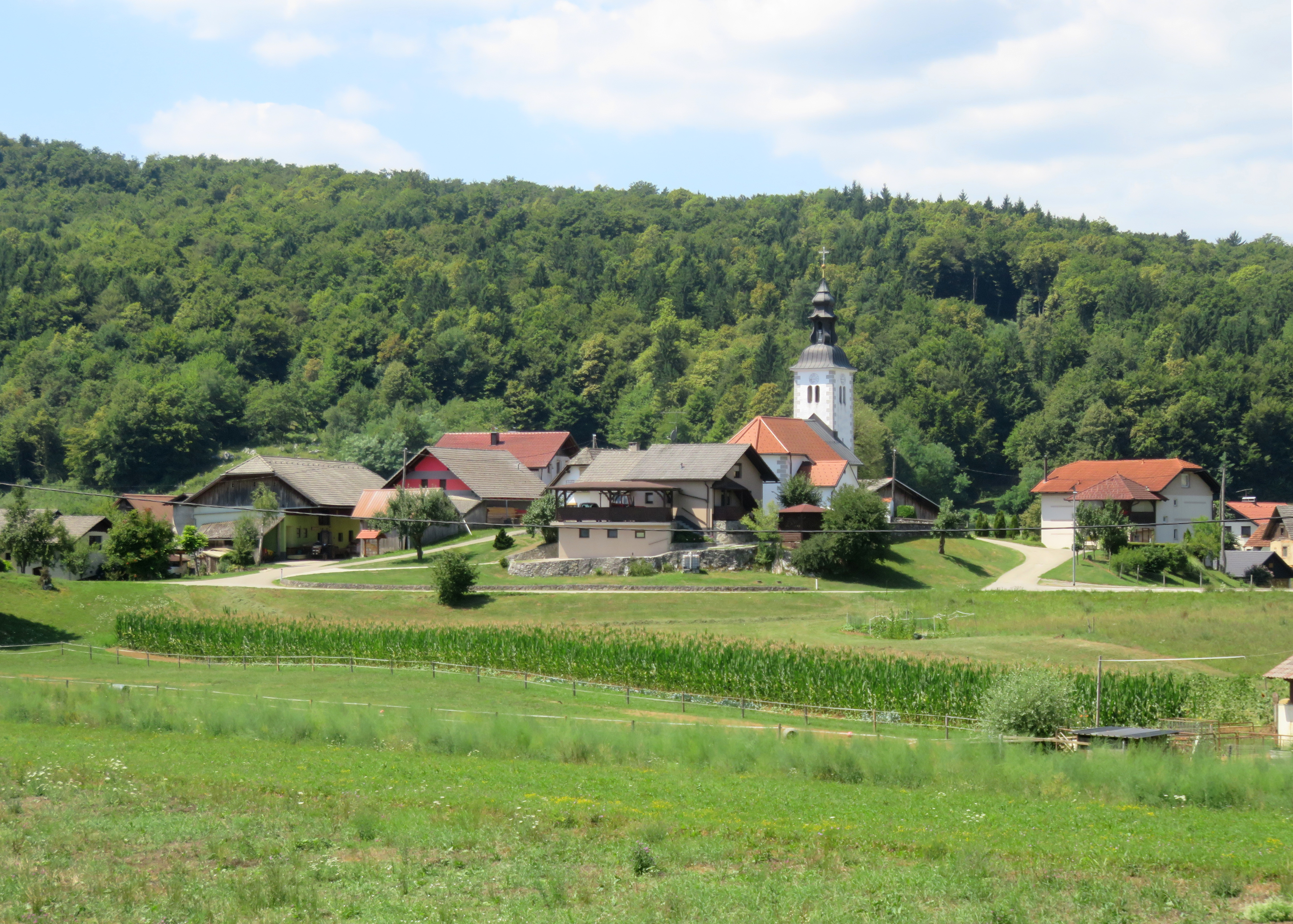

- Location in Slovenia
- Coordinates: 45°53′56.77″N 14°56′3.73″E
- Country: Slovenia
- Traditional region: Lower Carniola
- Statistical region: Southeast Slovenia
- Municipality: Trebnje

Area
  - Total: 1.69 km^{2} (0.65 sq mi)
- Elevation: 330 m (1,080 ft)

Population (2002)
  - Total: 51

Dolenje Selce (pronounced [dɔˈleːnjɛ ˈsɛːu̯tsɛ]) is a village in the Municipality of Trebnje in eastern Slovenia. The area is part of the historical region of Lower Carniola. The municipality is now included in the Southeast Slovenia Statistical Region.

== Geography ==
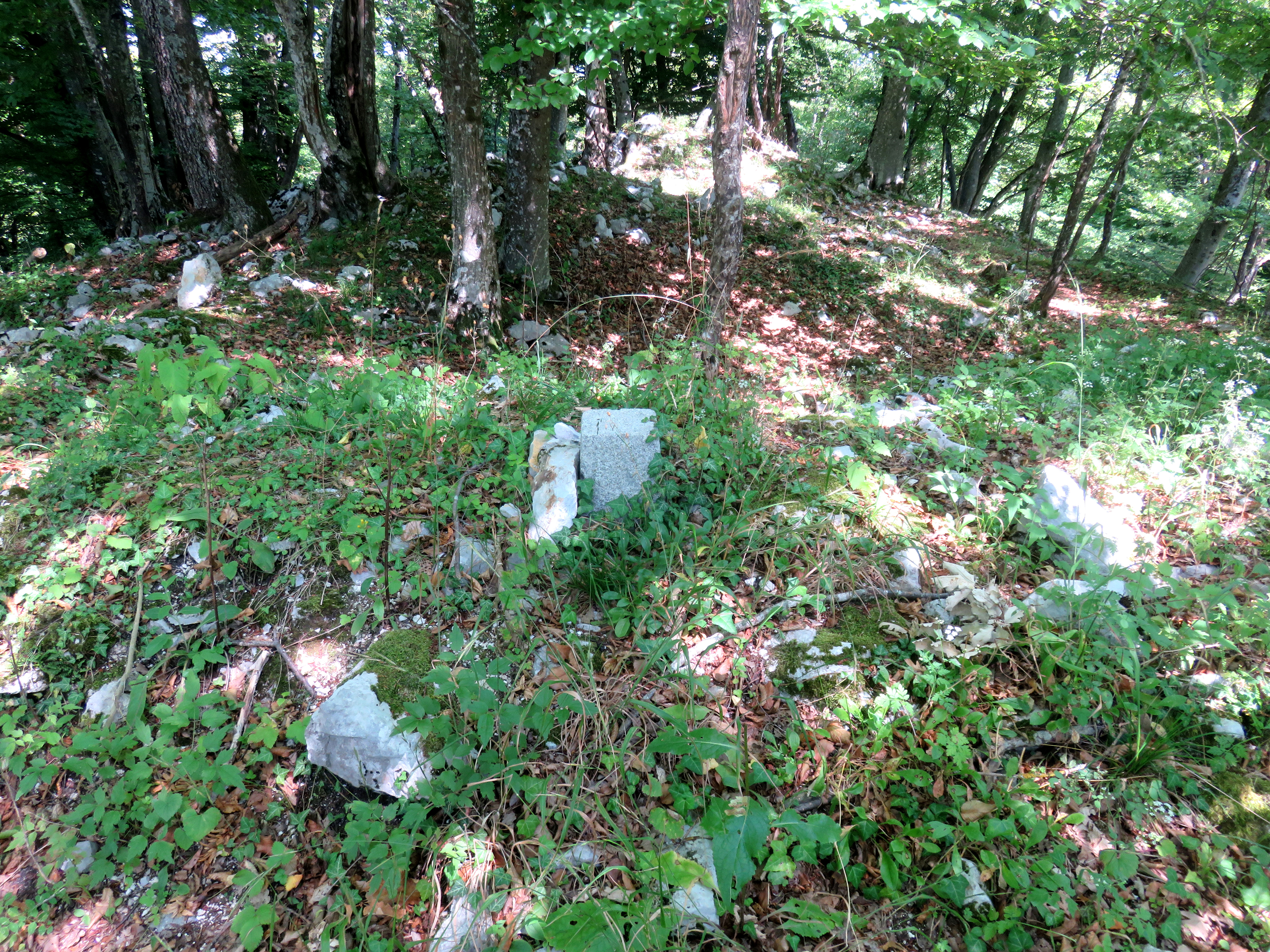
Kozjek Hill with survey benchmark

The summit of Kozjek Hill (elevation: 456 meters or 1,496 feet), with the ruins of Kozjak Castle, above the former village of Kozjak is the highest point in Dolenje Selce.

== Church ==
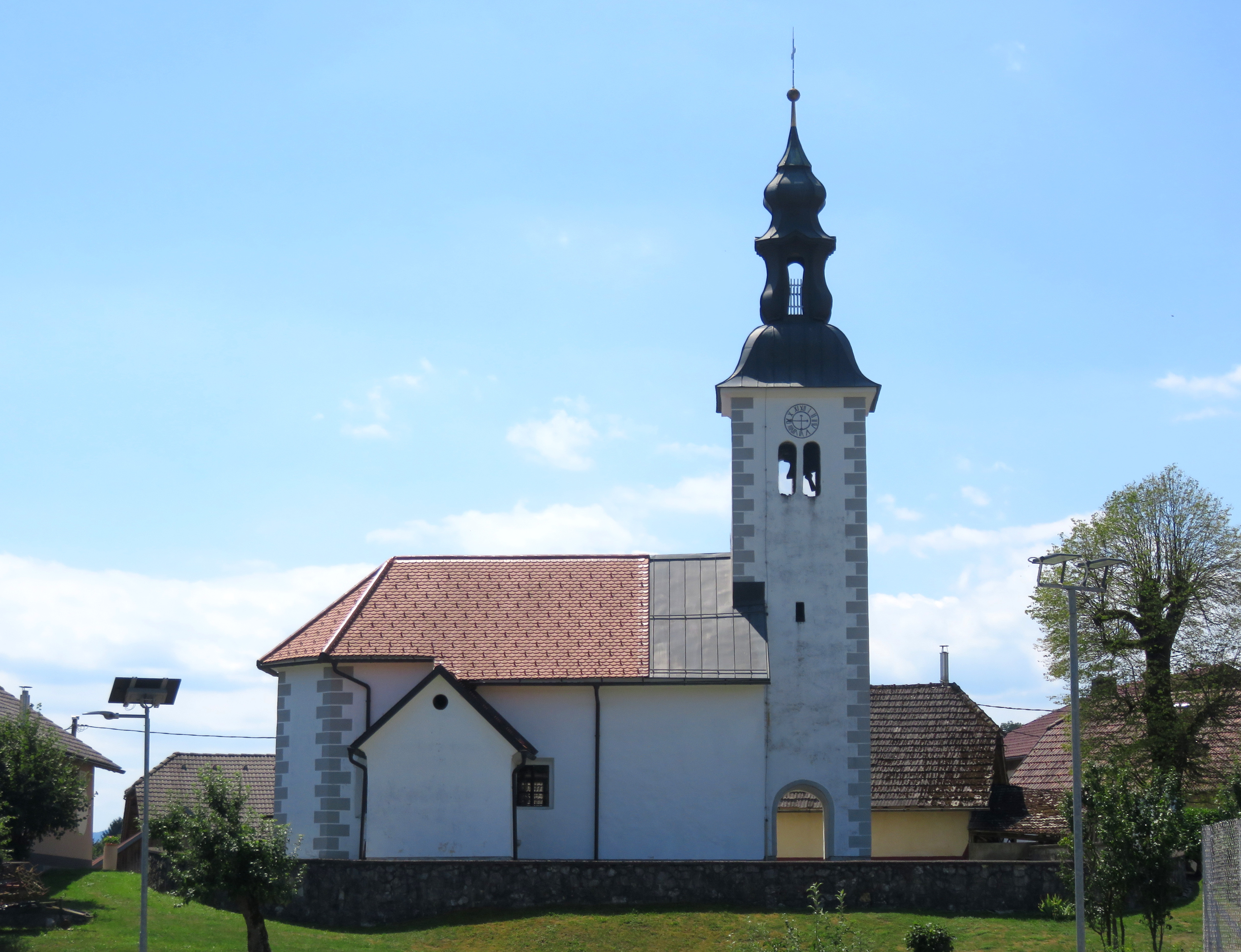
Saint Anthony the Great Church

The local church is dedicated to St. Anthony the Great and belongs to the Parish of Dobrnič. It was first mentioned in written documents dating to 1526. It was greatly remodelled in the Baroque style in the second half of the 17th century.
