= Trebnje Castle =

Castle in Slovenia

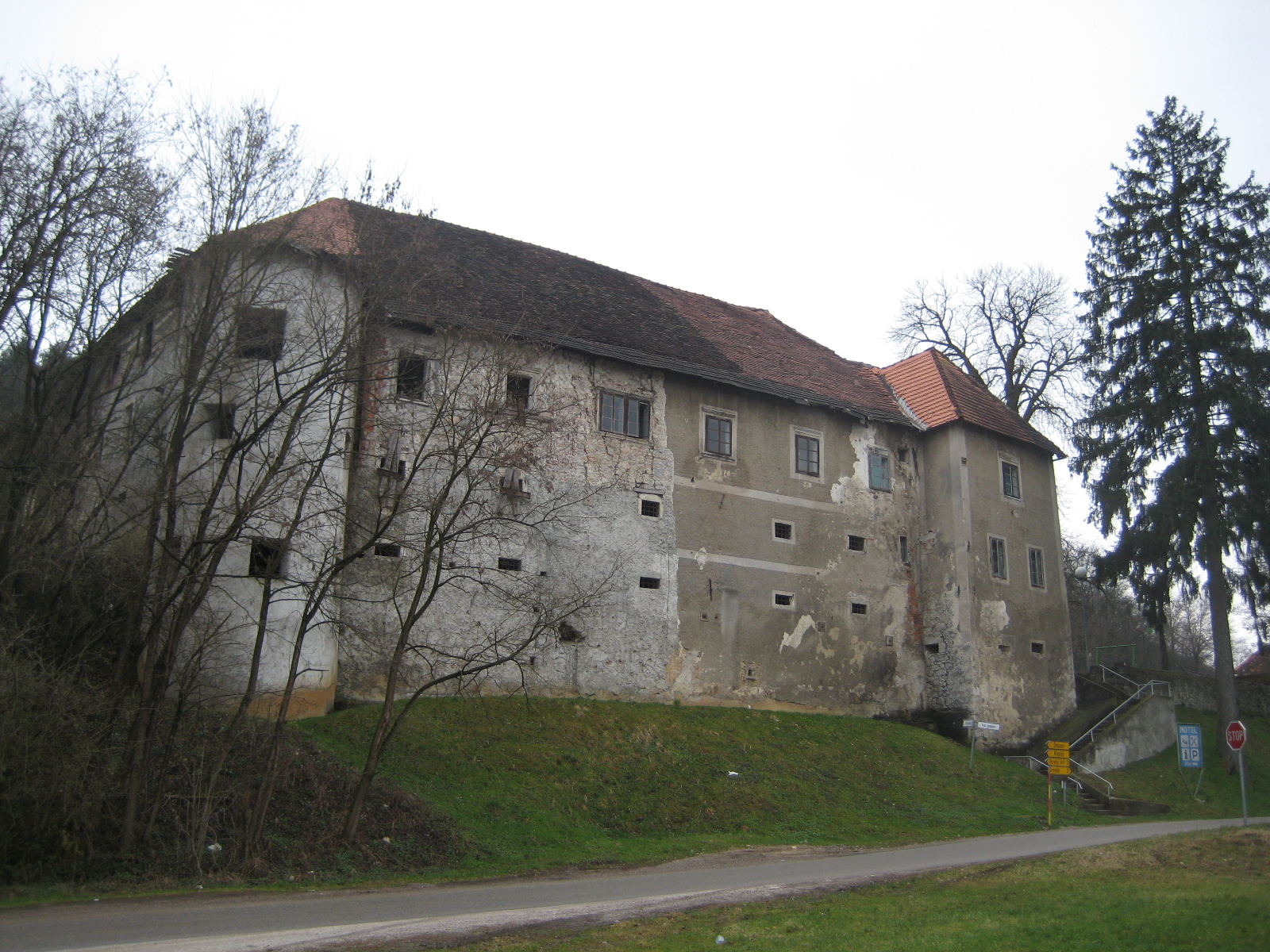
- Interactive map of the Trebnje Castle area

General information
- Coordinates: 45.9043°N 15.0061°E
- Year built: 1000

Trebnje Castle is a smaller castle located in the Slovenian town Trebnje, positioned on a plateau on the right bank of river Temenica. Sources claim that the castle was built around year 1000, which would make it one of the oldest Slovenian castles.

The castle has changed several owners over the years, ranging from local nobility, Habsburgs, and a missionary Frederic Baraga. Today, while the castle's fate remains uncertain, its condition is visibly deteriorating.

== History ==
It is believed that the castle was built around year 1000 by the Patriarchate of Aquileia and managed by their local vassal knights named de Treuen. Records attest that the castle's first vassal was Konrad de Treuen, who was then followed by Bernard, Henrik and Ulrik de Treuen between the years 1243 and 1245. A record from 1349 mentions the knight Hajncel, and Aquileian charters from 1358 refer to the knight Johannis de Treuen as the castle's overseers.

First mentions of the castle however date back to 1386 and 1436, and refer to it as Turn ze Treuen and turn zu Trefen mit dem purkchstal vnd dem pawhof, respectively.

According to a historian Valvasor, after the decline of knights of Treuen, the castle's ownership first passed to Counts of Ortenburg, and then to Counts of Celje, who owned the castle until 1456. With the demise of Counts of Celje, the castle was handed over to the Habsburgs as part of an inheritance agreement.

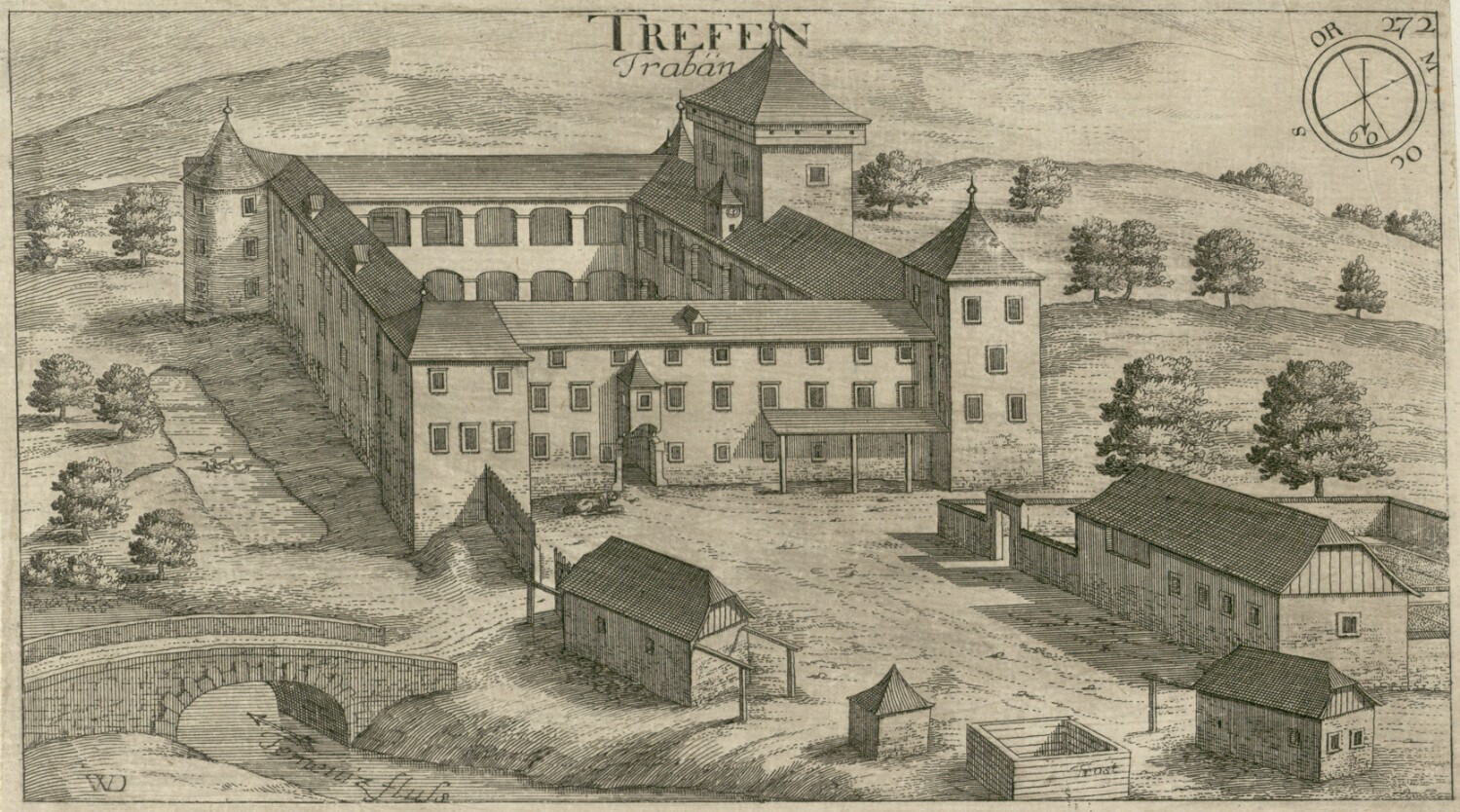
Trebnje Castle depicted in Valvasor's Topographia Ducatus Carnioliae modernae from 1679

In the Early modern period the castle changed several hands. Written recordings list the following owners:

- 1601: Gabrijel Križanič;
- 1652: Jurij Jankovič;
- 1679: Wolf Konrad Jankovič;
- 1685: Matej Kowatschitsch pl. Schmiedhofen, who was a toll collector of provincial tollhouses in Jesenice and imperial tollhouse;
- 1699: Stična Abbey;
- 1731: Jankovič family;
- 1734: Jožef Mihael pl. Wallensberg;
- 1767: Filip Mihael pl. Wallensberg, a son of Jožef Mihael pl. Wallensberg;
- 1799: Janez Nepomuk Baraga;
- 1812: Frederick Baraga, a missionary and a son of Janez Nepomuk Baraga;
- 1824: Jožek Gressel, a brother in law of Frederick Baraga;
- 1842: Anamalija Gressel, the wife of Jožek Gressel;
- 1869: Karel Gressel, a son of Ana Malija and Jožek Gressel;
- 1863: Marija Gressel, a widow after Karel Gressel;
- 1896: Matija Hočevar and Franc Hren.

The last owner before World War II was a Czech Evgen Evgen Šoulavy, after the war the castle was nationalized. For some time, the castle hosted the Trebnje primary school; later it was turned into social housing. Today, the castle is again in private hands.

== Architecture ==
Historians believe that the castle was initially built as an unfortified tower. Later, in 1530, the tower needed to be significantly fortified because of the threat of Turkish invasions. It was re-made in a massive renaissance four-tract building with three quadrangle and one circular tower.

Today, the castle comprises four one-floor living areas that surround rectangular inner courtyard. Three corners of the courtyard are strengthened with towers.

One enters the castle through a spacious, arched slit with two baroque portals on the left and the right. The courtyard is enclosed with arcades. The arcades on the left, northern side of the courtyard are hexagonal, supported by load-bearing walls and in the size of the ground floor. A taller set of arcades leads to a staircase that connects the ground floor with the upper floor.

Arcades of the eastern area are also hexagonal and supported by the load-bearing walls. Compared to the load-bearing wall on the northern side, these walls are placed in bigger intervals, causing arches to be pent-in instead of semicircular. Both southern and eastern arcades of the courtyard are walled. Pillars of the arcades are circular.

It hasn't been determined yet whether the castle incorporates any construction elements from the Middle Ages. During a probing inspection, researchers found remains of 2.36 m (7 ft 9 in)-thick foundation of an unidentified wall south of the wall, and remains of a 10 m (33 ft) wide moat with an adjacent external trench.
