= Minka Govekar =

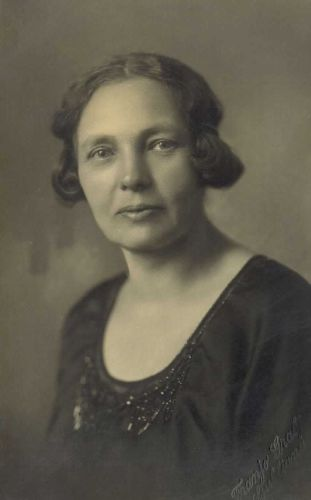
Minka Govekar

Minka Govekar (28 October 1874 – 10 April 1950) was a Slovene teacher, translator, and campaigner for women's rights.

== Life ==
Minka Govekar was born in Trebnje in 1874. Completing her education at Ljubljana from 1889 to 1893, she qualified as a teacher in 1895 and married in 1897.

In 1926 Govekar edited Slovenska žena (Slovenian Woman), a collection of articles on women in different periods of Slovenian history and different creative professions:

Slovenska ženska is the first Slovenian collection of women's essays and we take it to be a sort of a blueprint for some future thorough monograph about the suffering, striving and strife of Slovenian women.

In her own contribution to the collection, an essay on women authors, Govekar provided information on Fanny Hausmann, Jospina Turnograjska, Lujica Pesjak, Pavlina Pajkova, Marica Nadlišek Bartol, Marica II Strnad Cizarljeva and Zofka Kveder-Demetrovic.

== Works ==
- Dobra kuharica (The Good Cook), 1903
- Dobra gospodinja (The Good Housewife), 1908
- Slovenska žena (Slovenian Woman), Ljubljana, 1926
