= Minka Yady Camara =

Guinean footballer

Minka Camara
Personal information
- Full name: Minka Yady Camara
- Date of birth: 15 October 1989 (age 37)
- Place of birth: Conakry, Guinea
- Height: 1.75 m (5 ft 9 in)
- Position: Midfielder

Team information
- Current team: Aviron Bayonnais

Youth career
- 2003–2006: Fello Star Labé

Senior career*
Years	Team	Apps	(Gls)
2007	Fello Star Labé	23	(2)
2007–2009	Le Mans	0	(0)
2009–2011	Cholet	60	(8)
2011	Le Poiré-sur-Vie	0	(0)
2011–2012	Jura Sud Lavans	8	(2)
2012–2014	Tarbes	59	(7)
2014–2017	Mont-de-Marsan	68	(0)
2017–	Aviron Bayonnais	48	(0)

International career
2008–2009	Guinea	3	(1)
- * Club domestic league appearances and goals as of 14 July 2020

Minka Yady Camara (born 15 October 1989) is a Guinean professional footballer who plays for Aviron Bayonnais.

== Club career ==
Camara was born in Conakry, Guinea. He began his career with Fello Star Labé before signing for Le Mans UC72 in summer 2007. After three years with Le Mans in France's Ligue 1 he left the club in summer 2009 to sign for SO Cholet.

== International career ==
He is also a member of the Guinea national football team.
