= Trebnje =

- Town
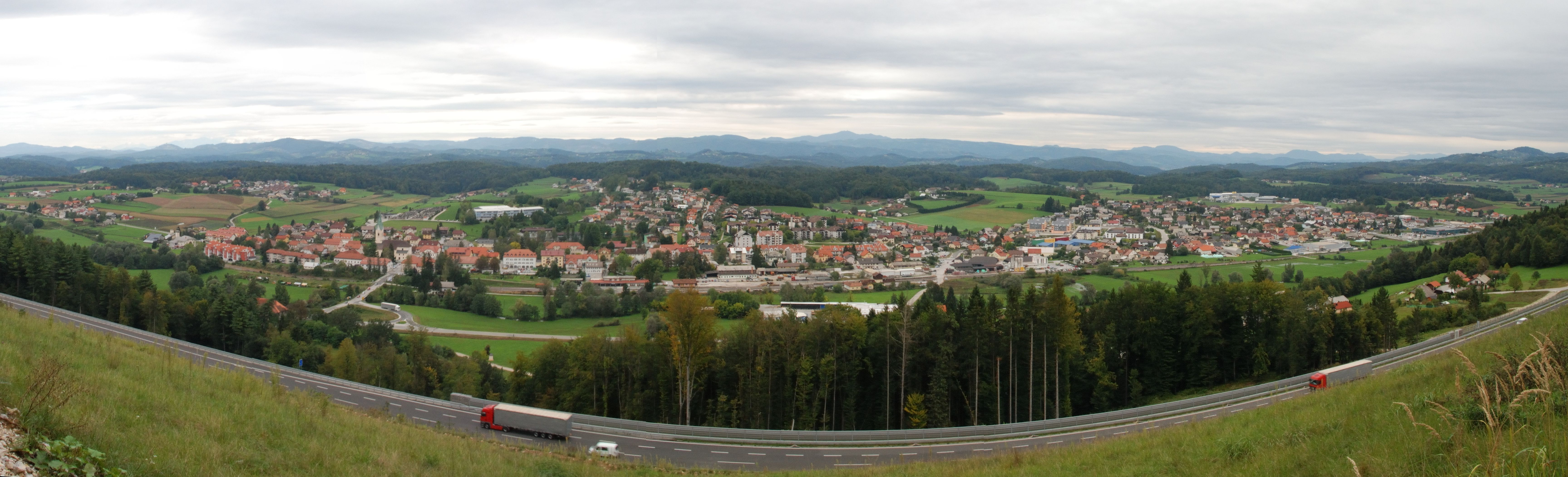
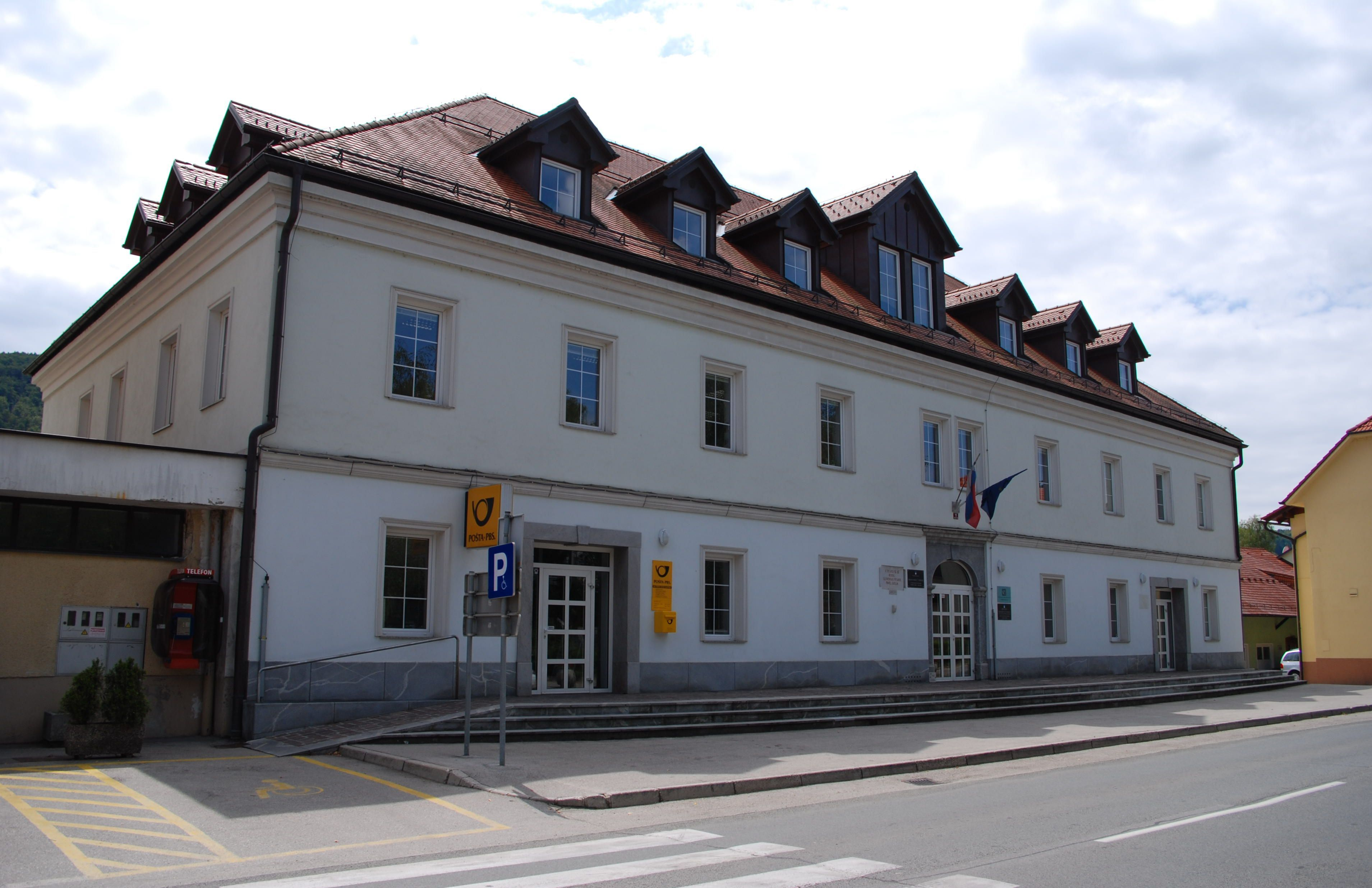
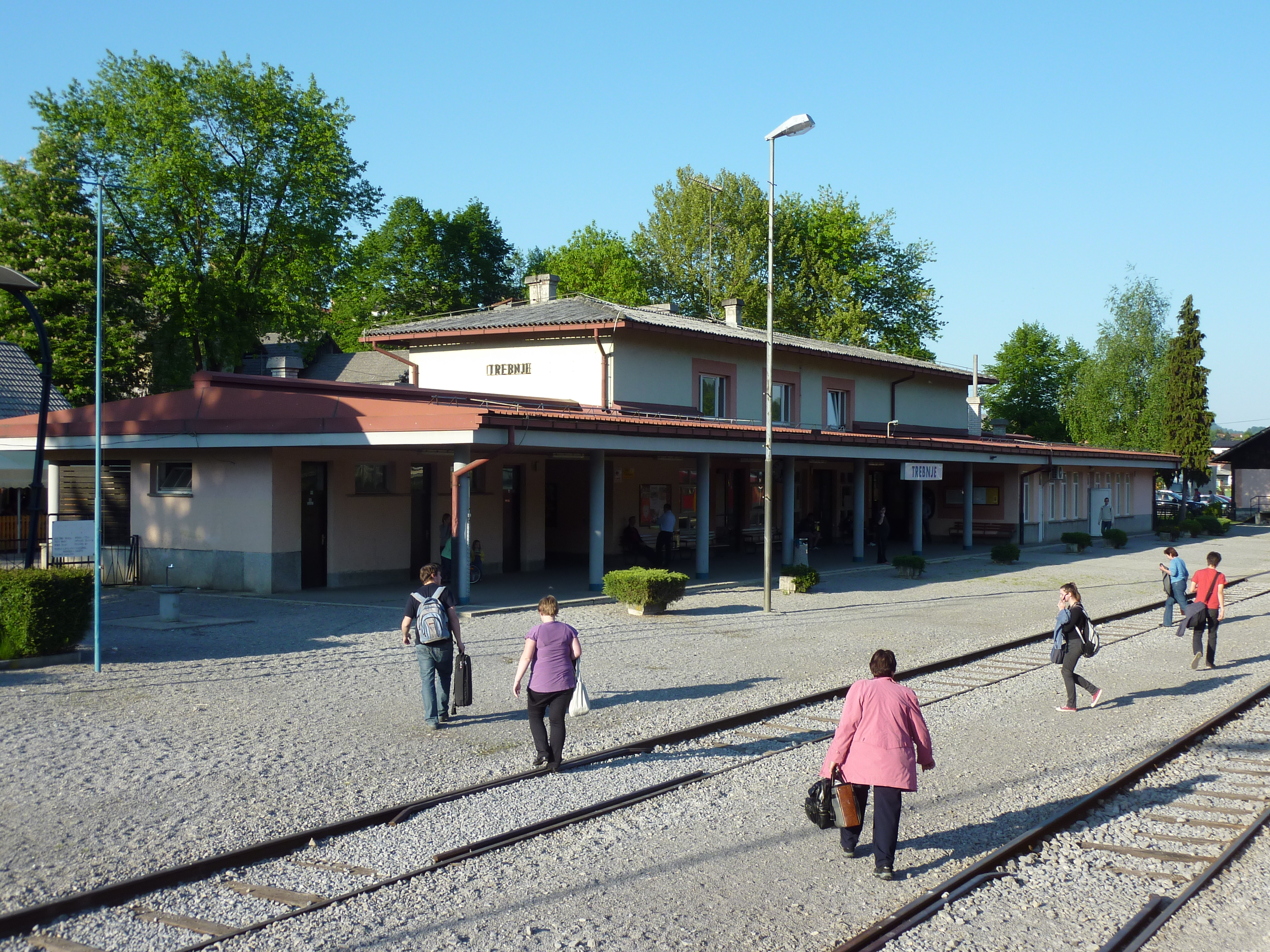
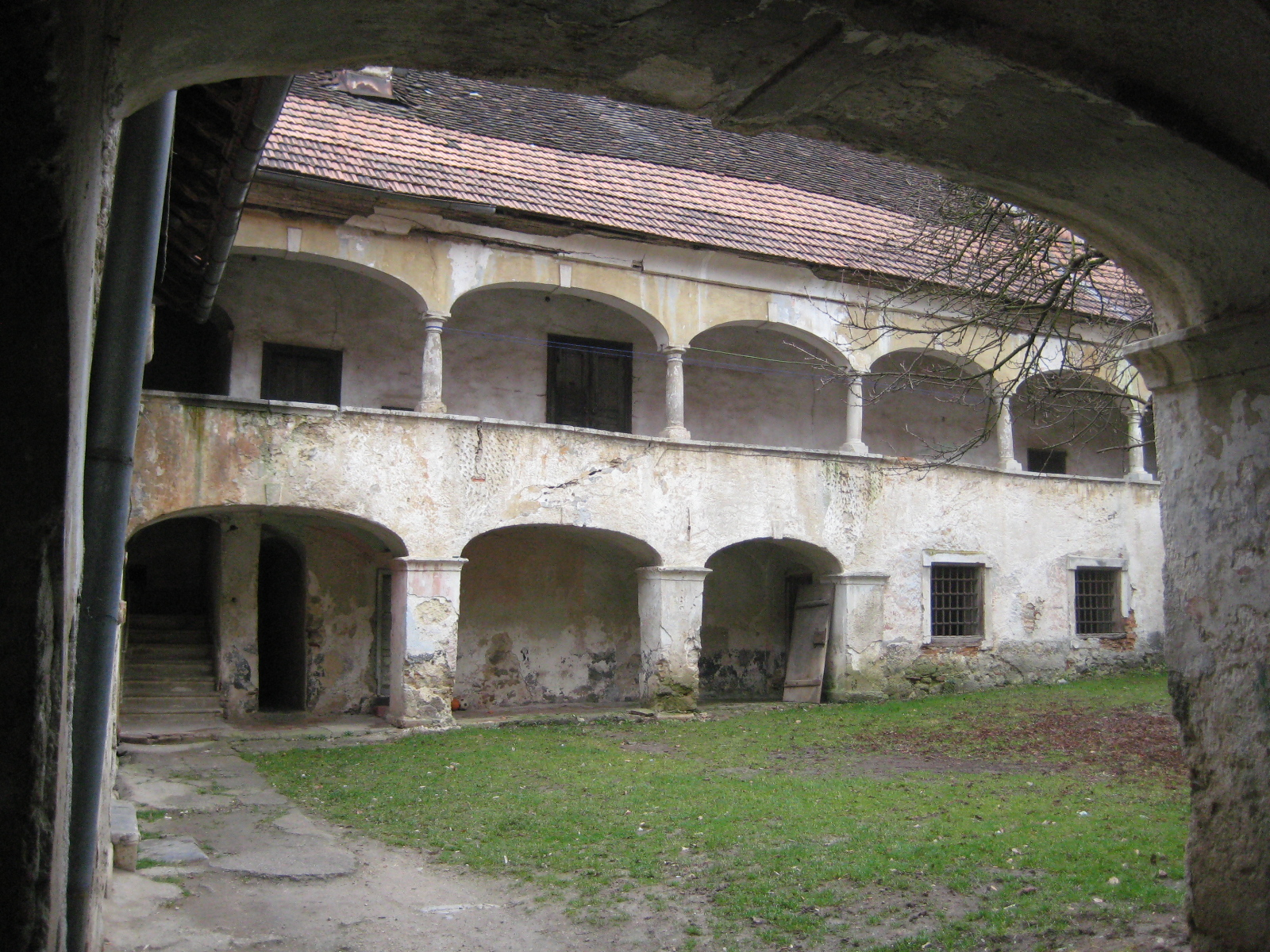
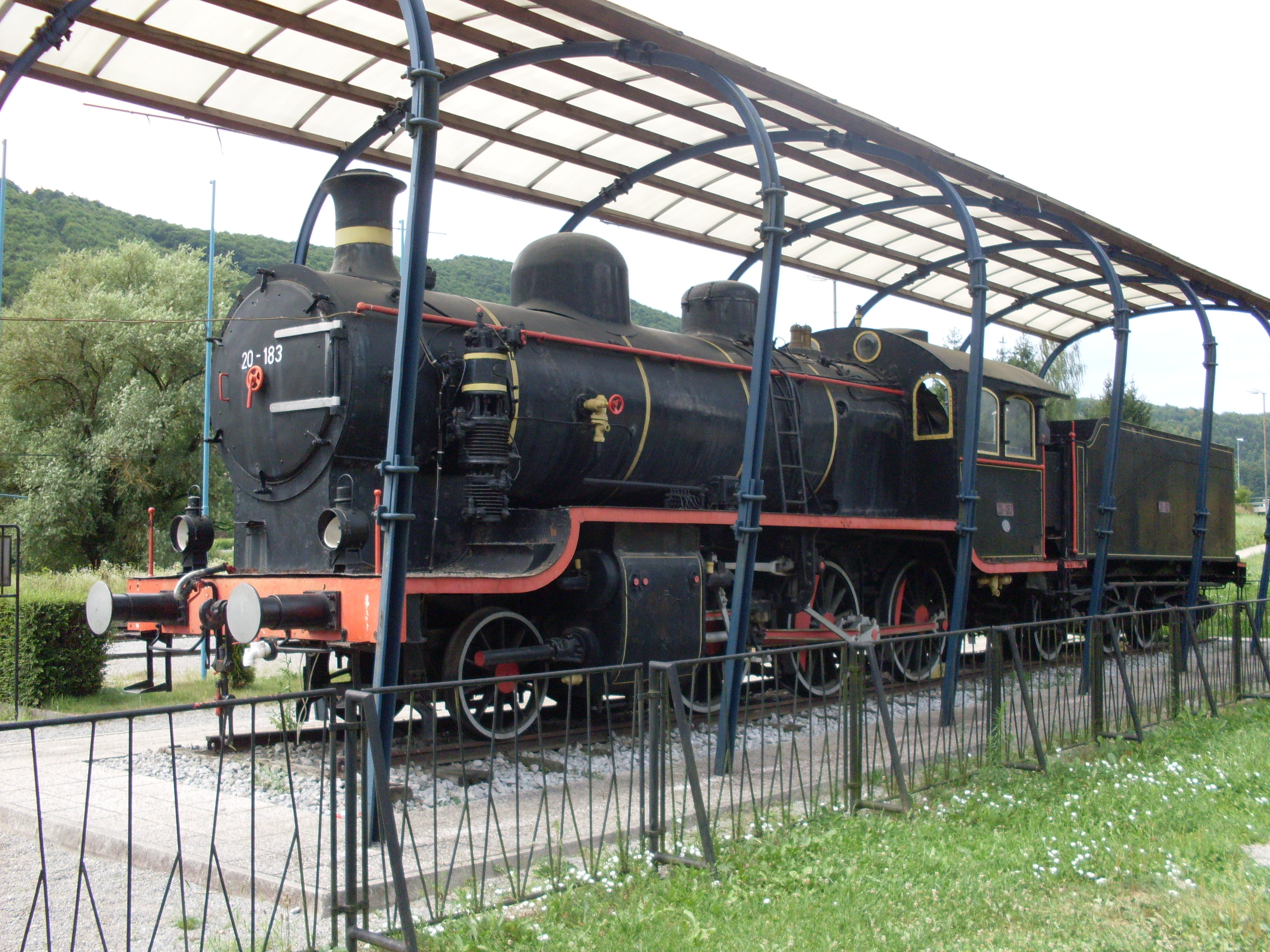
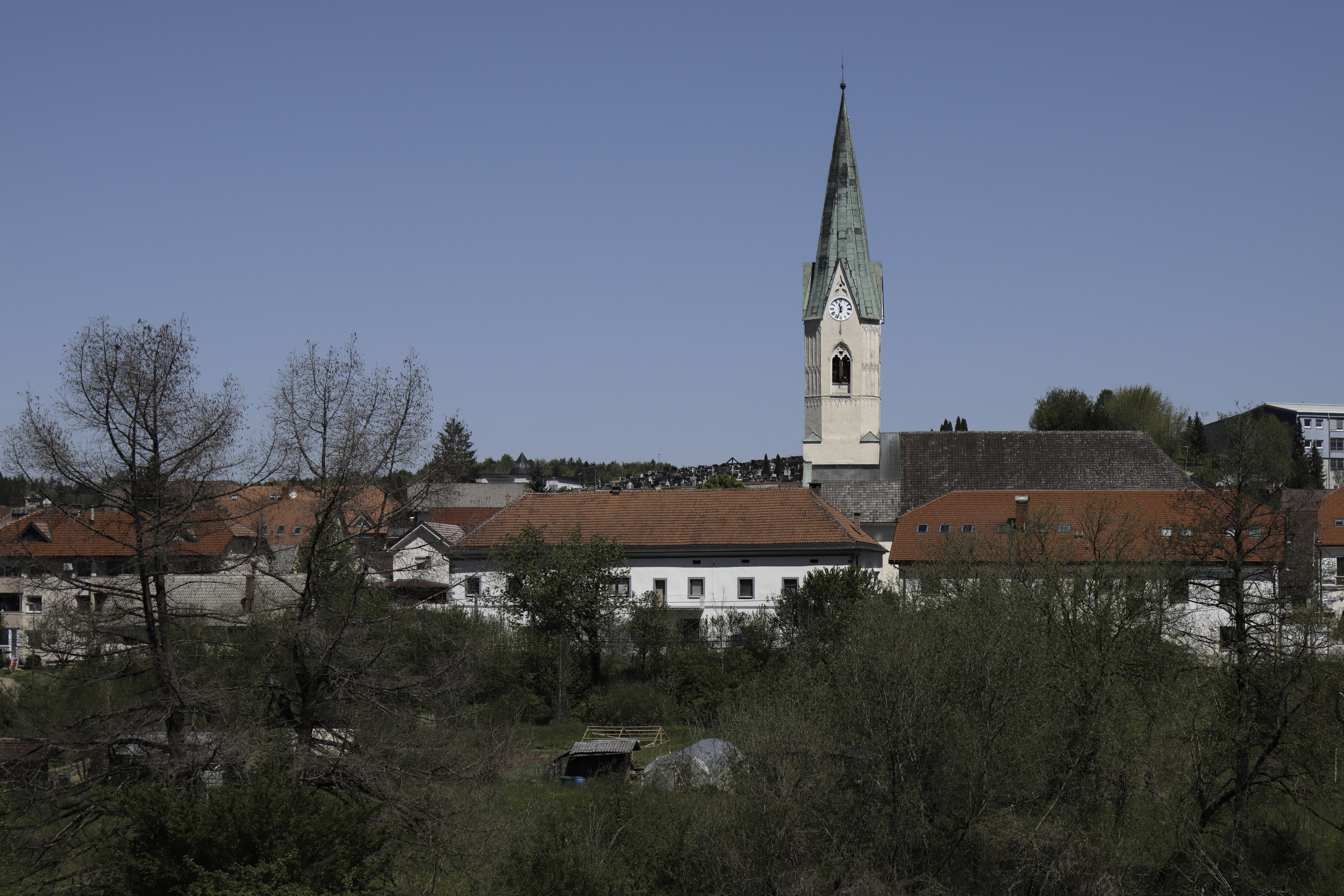
- From top, left to right: Overview of Trebnje, Golia House, Railway station, Castle courtyard, Steam locomotive, View of the town centre with St. Mary's church

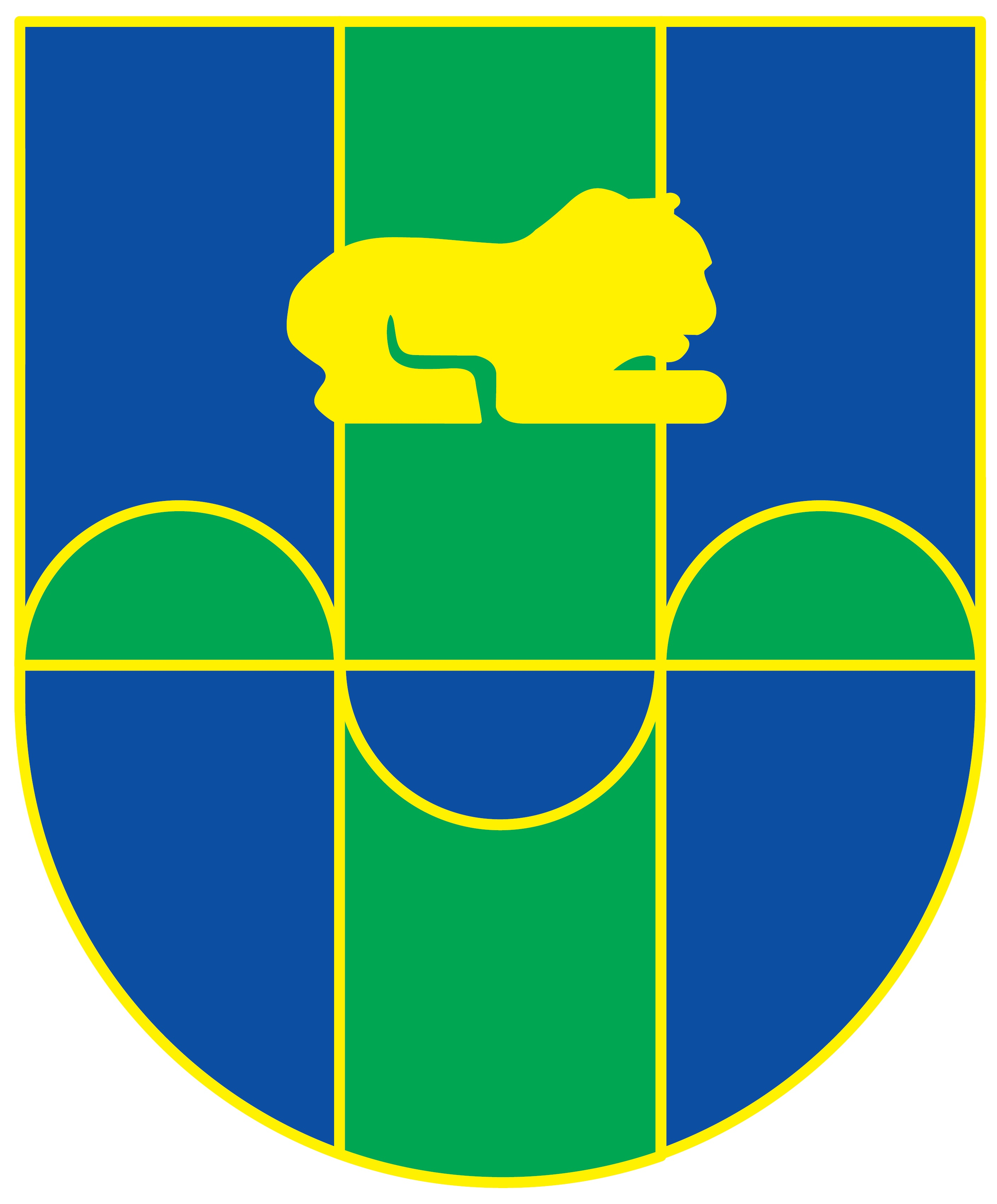
- Coat of arms

- Location in Slovenia
- Coordinates: 45°54′37.36″N 15°0′31.06″E
- Country: Slovenia
- Traditional region: Lower Carniola
- Statistical region: Southeast Slovenia
- Municipality: Trebnje

Area
  - Total: 4.1 km^{2} (1.6 sq mi)
- Elevation: 288.5 m (947 ft)

Population (2012)
  - Total: 3,478
- Vehicle registration: NM

Trebnje (pronounced [ˈtɾéːbnjɛ], German: Treffen) is a town in southeastern Slovenia. It lies on the Temenica River in the traditional region of Lower Carniola, and is the seat of the Municipality of Trebnje.

The area was already settled in Antiquity. The modern settlement developed on the main regional road and railway line from Ljubljana to Novo Mesto. The old town center with the parish church stands slightly raised on the left bank of Temenica River, and the new part extends to the north from the railway line and the regional road toward Novo Mesto.

== Name ==
Trebnje was attested in historical sources in 1163 as Treuen (and as Treven in 1228, Trefen in 1389, and Treben in 1437). The name is believed to be a clipped form of Trěbьńe selo 'Trěbъ's village', presumably referring to an early inhabitant of the place. A less likely theory derives the name from the verb *trěbiti 'to clean, clear (land)', thus referring to an area cleared for settlement. Another hypothesis, considered very unlikely, derives the name from an Old Slavic sacrifice ritual called treba 'sacrifice'.

== History ==
The area was already settled by humans in the Stone Age. In the Roman times, a settlement named Praetorium Latobicorum was located in the area, along the road linking Emona and Siscia. After the decline of the Roman Empire, the first mention of Trebnje as a market town dates to 1351, and a proto-parish was mentioned in 1163.

At the end of the 18th century, Trebnje was the seat of the district commissioner. Later it also became the seat of the political, judicial, fiscal, and electoral districts as well as an important station on a regular mail connection between Ljubljana and Karlovac.

Trebnje's economic progress was facilitated by its favorable transport position at the intersection of local roads and a railway. Trebnje remained a small economic center of its agricultural surroundings until the end of Second World War despite this position. After 1958, when it became the center of a municipality and a new road between Ljubljana and Zagreb had been built, Trebnje developed metal, woodworking, textile, and construction industries.

== Landmarks ==
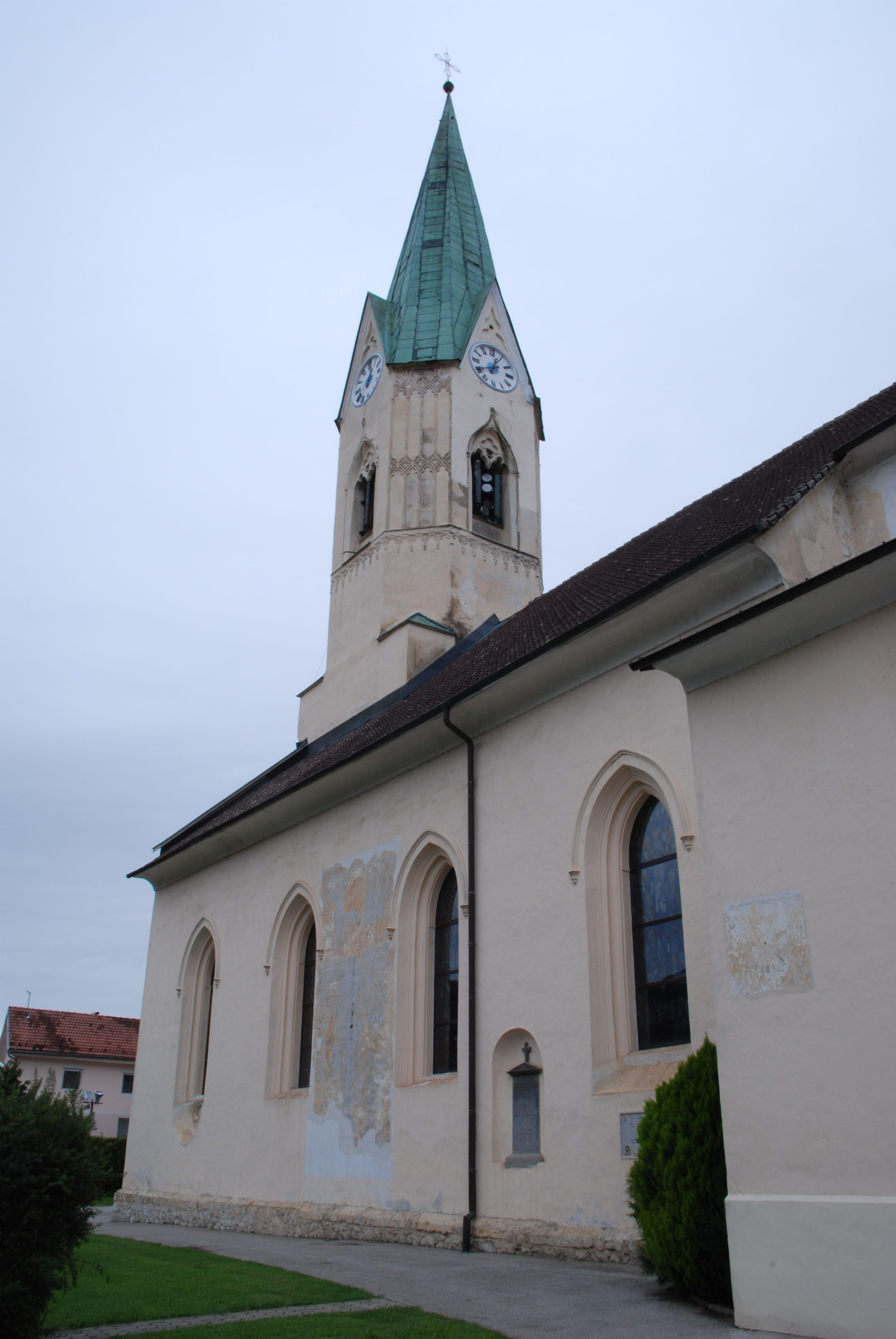
Assumption Church

The parish church in the town is dedicated to the Assumption of Mary and belongs to the Roman Catholic Diocese of Novo Mesto. It was first mentioned in written documents dating to 1163. The building dates to the mid-15th century. It was vaulted in 1645 and extended in the mid-18th century. At the main entrance of the church one can see a Roman stone relief of three busts, and the main altar's painting was made by Matevž Langus. A statue dedicated to Frederic Baraga, a missionary and linguist, stands in front of the church.

Trebnje Castle is a 13th-century castle on the right bank of the Temenica River south of the town centre. It was extended in the 17th and 18th century. It owes its current look to a 19th-century remodelling in the historicist style.

Historical population
Year	Pop.	±%
1948	419	—
1953	434	+3.6%
1961	571	+31.6%
1971	878	+53.8%
1981	2,467	+181.0%
1991	2,805	+13.7%
2002	3,150	+12.3%
2011	3,477	+10.4%
2021	3,858	+11.0%
Population size may be affected by changes in administrative divisions.

== Transport ==
A railway has connected Trebnje with Novo Mesto and Ljubljana since 1894, and with the town of Sevnica since 1938. Part of the railway towards Sevnica up to the mining settlement of Krmelj was already built by 1908, although since 1996 Krmelj has not been included on it. Since 2010, the A2 motorway, traversing Slovenia from northwest to southeast, has run past Trebnje.

== Notable persons ==
Notable people that were born or lived in Trebnje include:

- Janez Verbič (1768–1849), veterinarian
- Frederic Baraga (1797–1868), missionary and linguist, lived in Trebnje Castle in his youth
- Antonija Höffern (1803–1871), educator, sister of Baraga
- Franja Tomšič (1834–1922), mother of Rudolf Maister
- Ema Peče (1873–1965), born in Stari Trg (now Trebnje), teacher, editor
- Minka Govekar (1874–1950), teacher, translator, active in women's rights movement
- Pavel Golia (1887–1959), poet, playwright, director of Drama theater
- Vilma Bukovec (1920–2016), prima donna, soprano
- Janez Gartnar (1928–2012), judge
- Iva Zupančič (1931–2017), attended school in Trebnje, stage actress
