= Dobrnič =

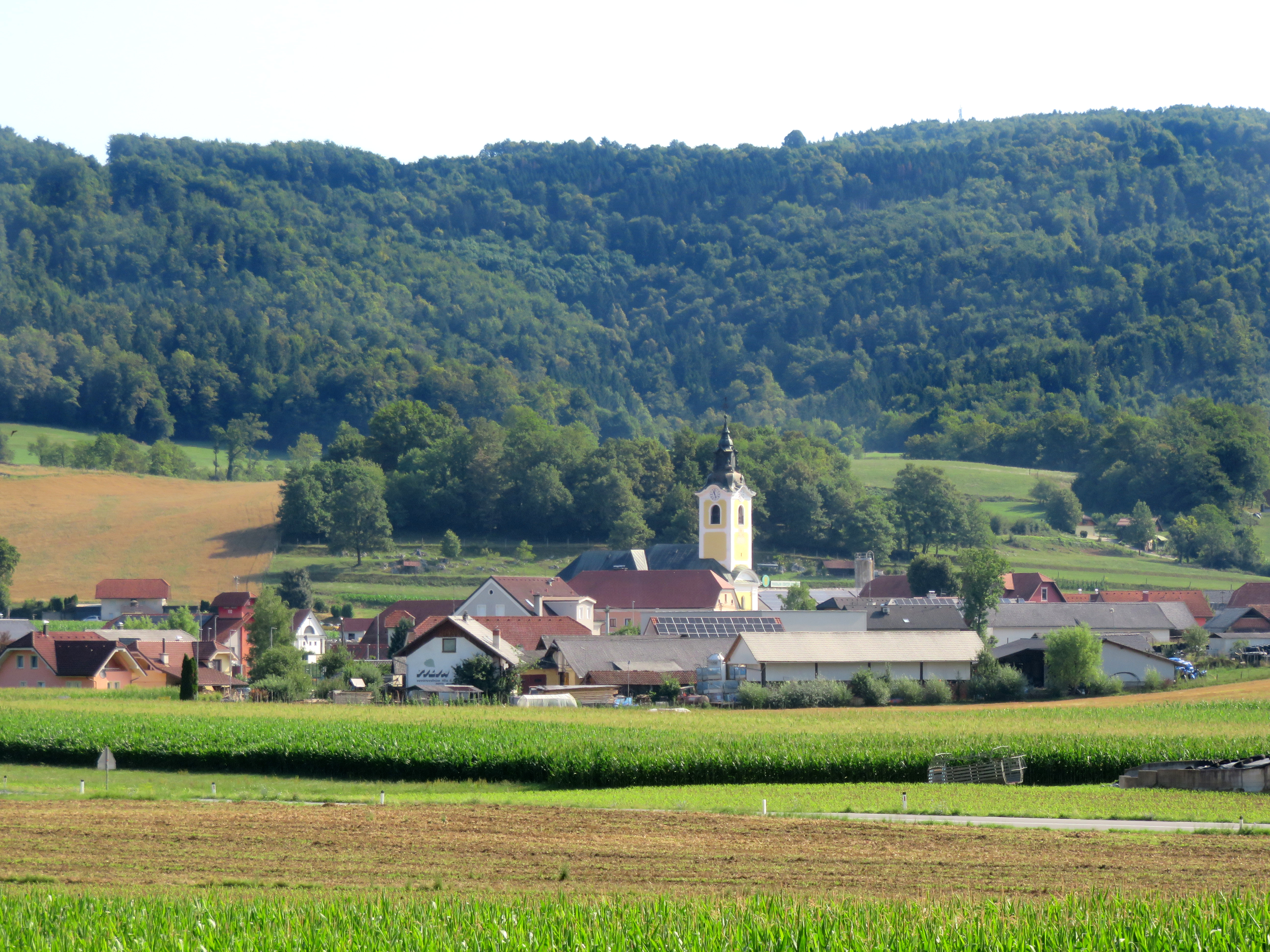

- Location in Slovenia
- Coordinates: 45°52′34.59″N 14°58′42.98″E
- Country: Slovenia
- Traditional region: Lower Carniola
- Statistical region: Southeast Slovenia
- Municipality: Trebnje

Area
  - Total: 0.37 km^{2} (0.14 sq mi)
- Elevation: 242.2 m (795 ft)

Population (2002)
  - Total: 75

Dobrnič (pronounced [ˈdoːbəɾnitʃ]) is a village in the Municipality of Trebnje in eastern Slovenia. It lies on the regional road from Trebnje to Žužemberk and is the largest settlement in the Dobrnič Basin. The area is part of the traditional region of Lower Carniola. The municipality is now included in the Southeast Slovenia Statistical Region.

== Name ==
Dobrnič was first attested in written records as Dobernik in 1136 (and as Dövernik before 1250 and Dowernik in 1296). It was known as Döbernik in German in the past. The name is pronounced locally as Du̯óbərənč. The old attestations indicate that the name form was originally *Dobrnik and it is likely that the modern Slovene name is a back-formation from the demonym Dobrničan. If so, the name is presumably derived from Common Slavic *dǫbrъ 'place where there is a deciduous or oak forest', in turn derived from *dǫbъ 'deciduous tree, oak'.

== Church ==
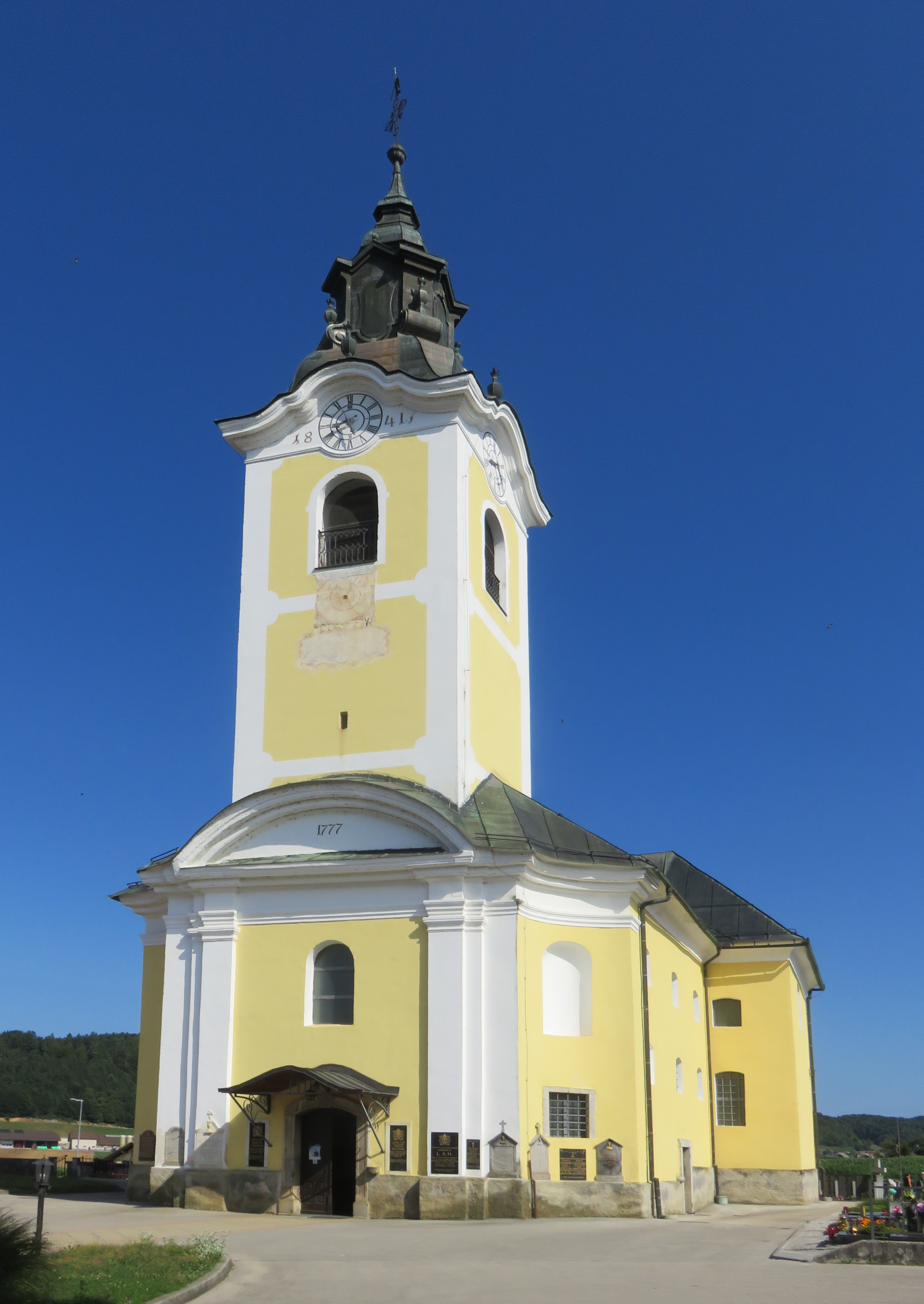
View from southeast

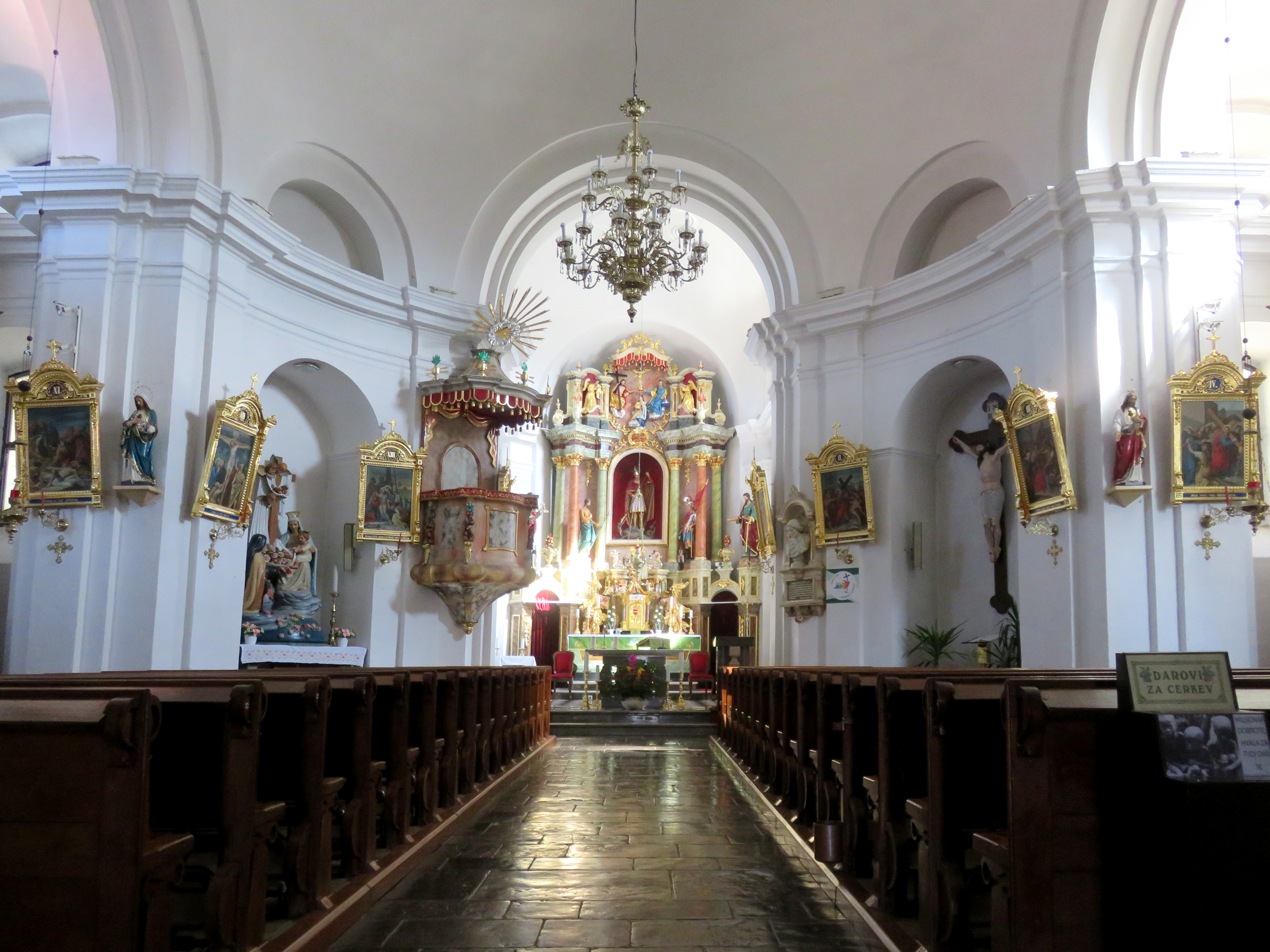
Interior

Saint George's Church

The local parish church is dedicated to Saint George and belongs to the Roman Catholic Diocese of Novo Mesto. It was built in 1777.
