= Črna =

Črna may refer to several places in Slovenia:

- Črna, Idrija, a formerly independent settlement, now part of Dole
- Črna pri Kamniku, a village in the Municipality of Kamnik
- Municipality of Črna na Koroškem, a municipality in northern Slovenia
- Črna na Koroškem, a town in northern Slovenia, seat of the municipality
