= Zavratec, Idrija =

Zavratec
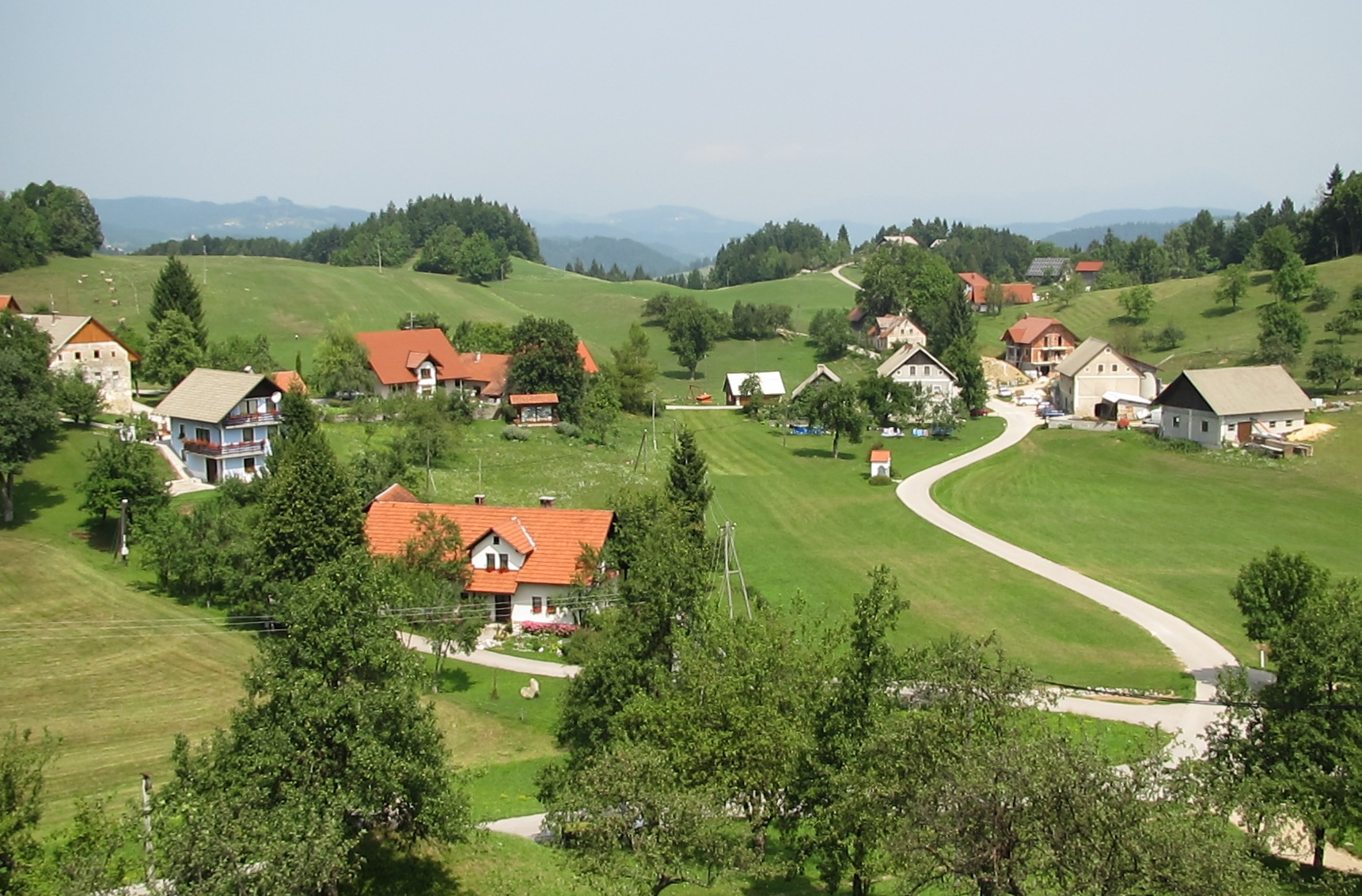
- Zavratec

- Location in Slovenia
- Coordinates: 45°59′31″N 14°7′54.27″E
- Country: Slovenia
- Traditional region: Inner Carniola
- Statistical region: Gorizia
- Municipality: Idrija

Area
  - Total: 3.81 km^{2} (1.47 sq mi)
- Elevation: 699.4 m (2,295 ft)

Population (2002)
  - Total: 118

Zavratec (pronounced [zaˈwɾaːtəts]; German: Sauratz) is a village in the hills east of Idrija in the traditional Inner Carniola region of Slovenia.

== Geography ==
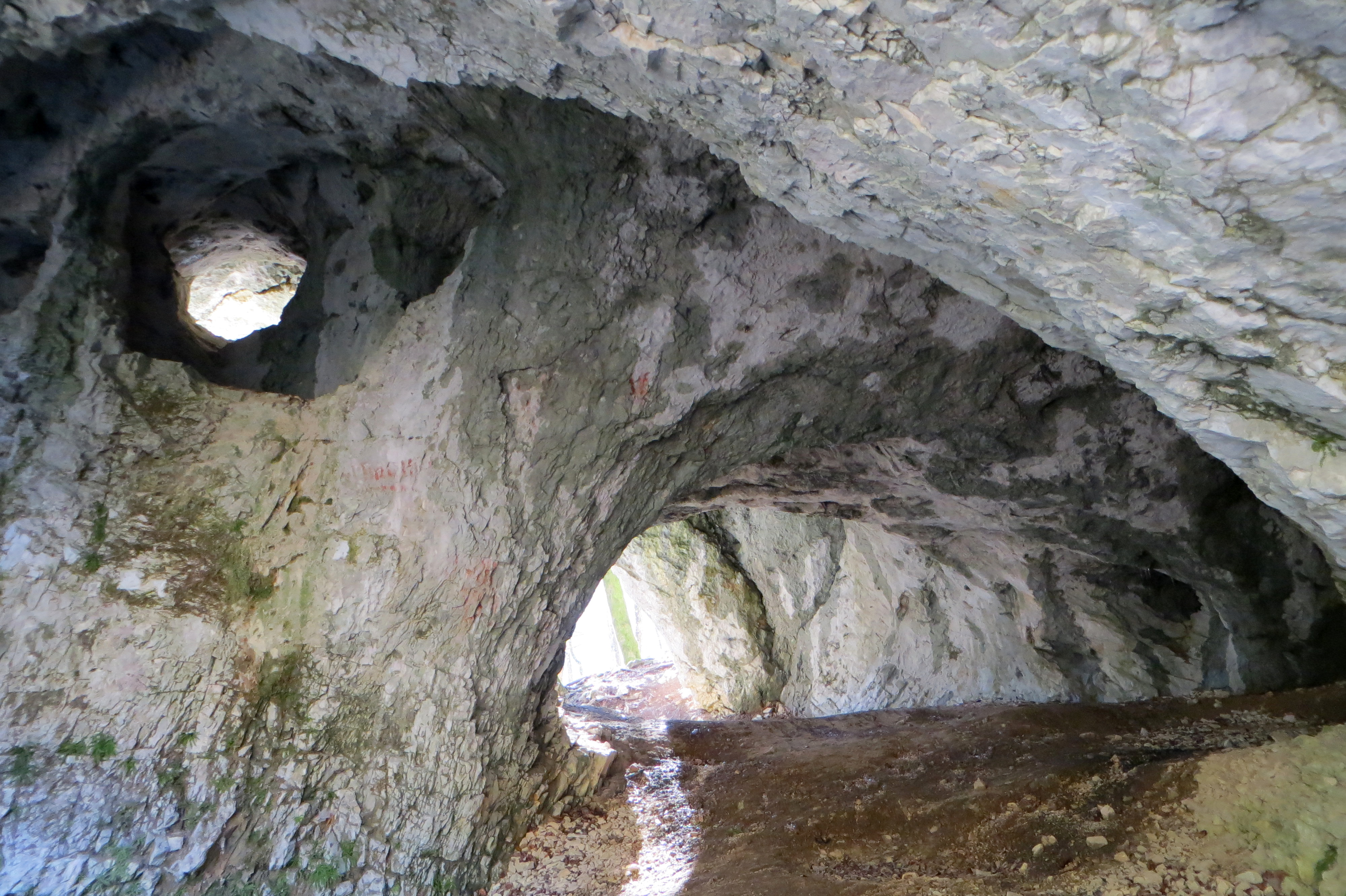
Matjaž's Chambers Cave

Zavratec lies in a small valley surrounded by hills above the valley of Sovra Creek to the north. It includes the hamlets of Zgornji Zavratec and Spodnji Zavratec (literally, 'upper Zavratec' and 'lower Zavratec'). Mravljišče Hill (867 meters or 2,844 feet) rises southwest of the village. The floor of the valley, where the soil is moister, has meadows, and there are tilled fields on the surrounding slopes. Forested land lies mostly to the west, toward the hamlet of Črna in neighboring Dole. In the extreme northeast part of the settlement's territory, above Sovra Creek, is a cave known as Matjaž's Chambers (Slovene: Matjaževe kamre). The cave has six entrances, and archaeologists have found bones of cave bears and other Ice Age animals in it, as well as tools made by Neanderthals (54,000–47,000 YBP) and Homo sapiens (17,000–10,000 YBP).

== Name ==
Zavratec was attested as Czabratza in historical sources in 1500. The etymology of the name is uncertain; it has been suggested that it may be connected to the common noun vrata 'gate', referring to a narrow passage, or to the hydronym Sovra.

== History ==
During the interwar period, Zavratec was part of the Kingdom of Italy, close to the border with Yugoslavia. A dairy operated in the village until 1954, from which cream was sent to Godovič. In 1965 test drilling was carried out near Zavratec in a search for mercury ore.

== Church ==
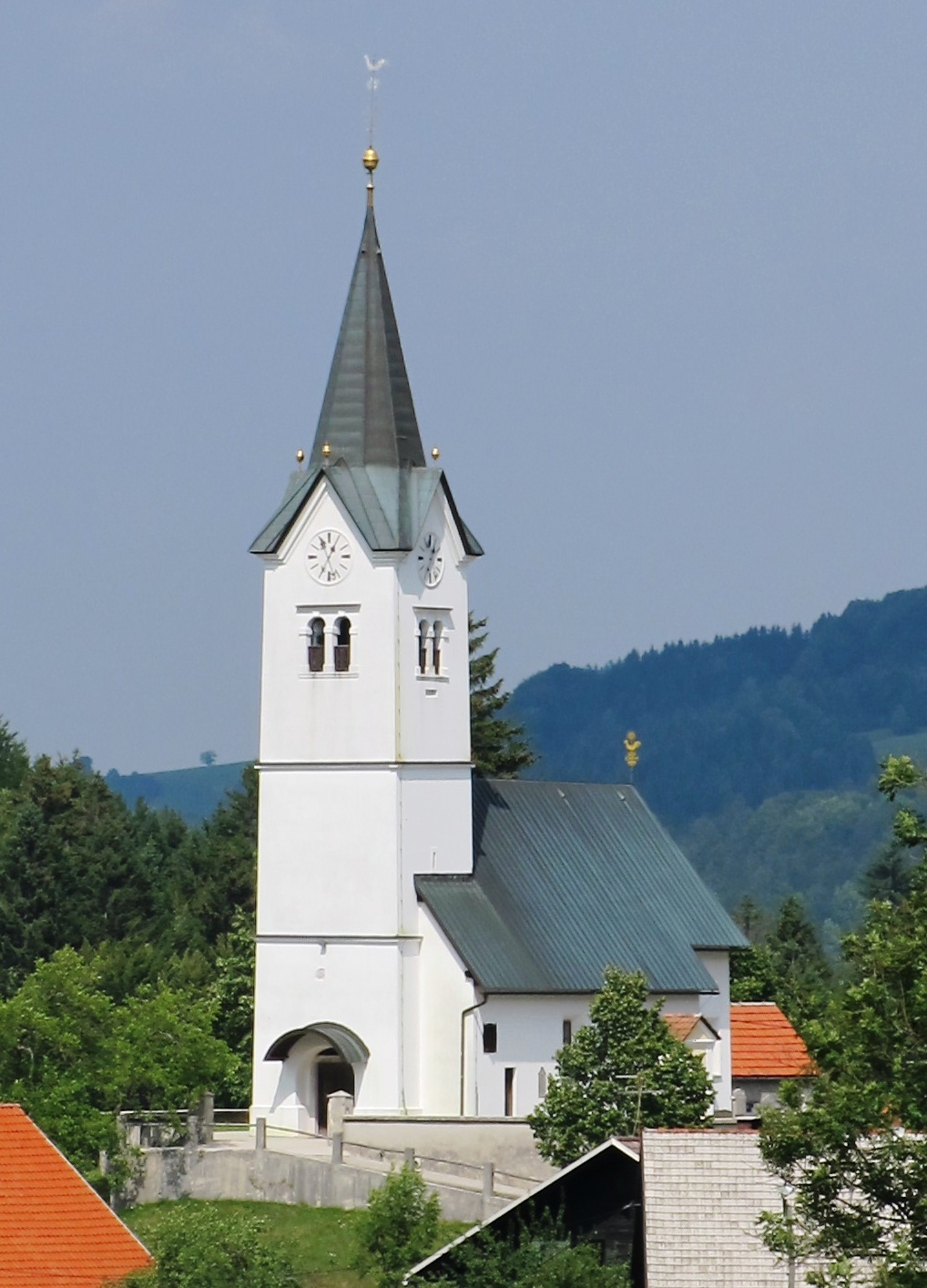
Saint Ulrich's Church

The parish church in the settlement is dedicated to Saint Ulrich and belongs to the Koper Diocese. It is a Baroque building dating to 1647 with an octagonal chancel walled on three sides, a wide rectangular nave, and a belfry. The interior of the nave and the chancel are ornamented with frescoes dating to 1713. Additional remodeling took place in 1747. The church is surrounded by a cemetery.

== Gallery ==
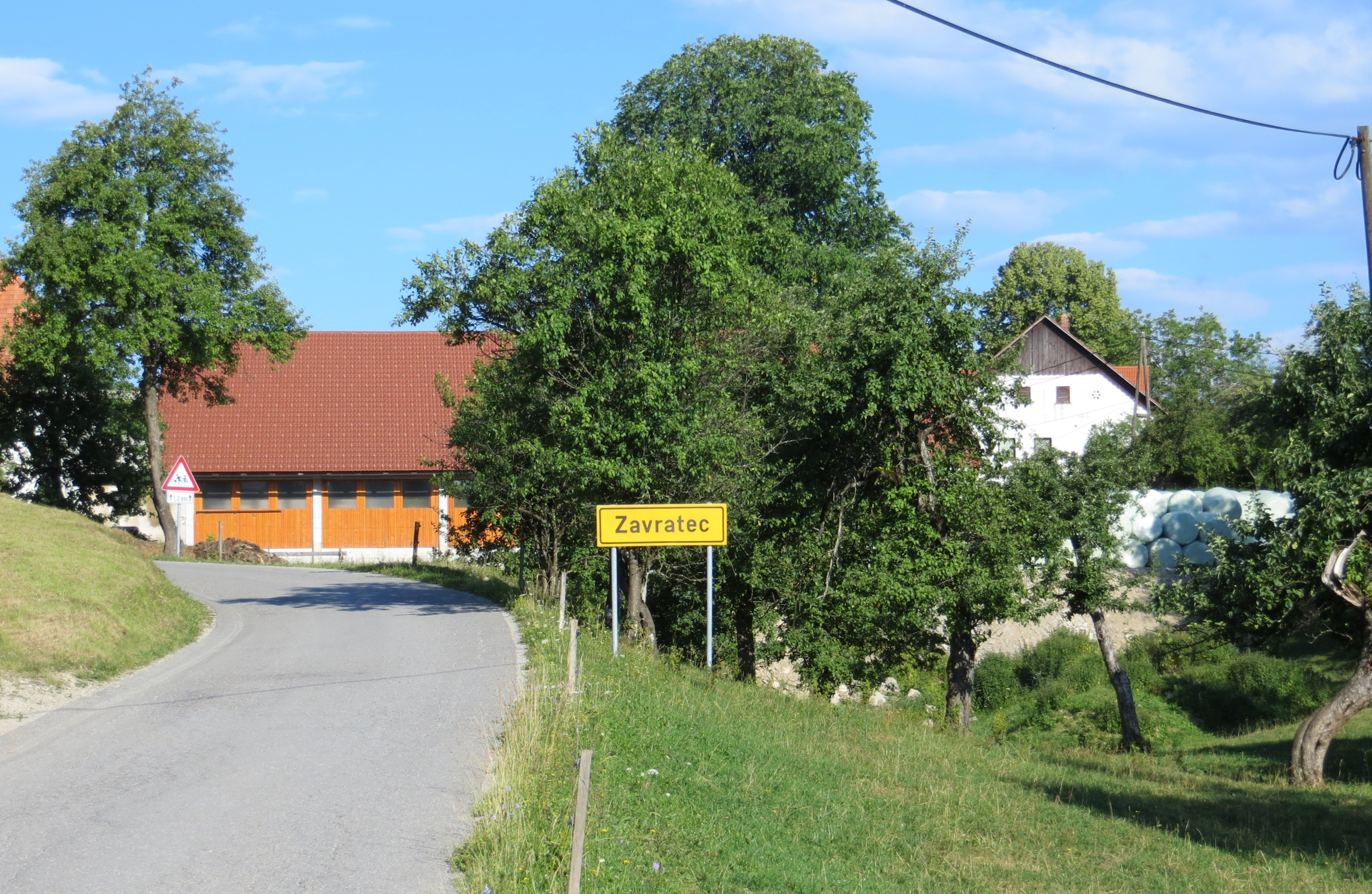
The hamlet of Spodnji Zavratec

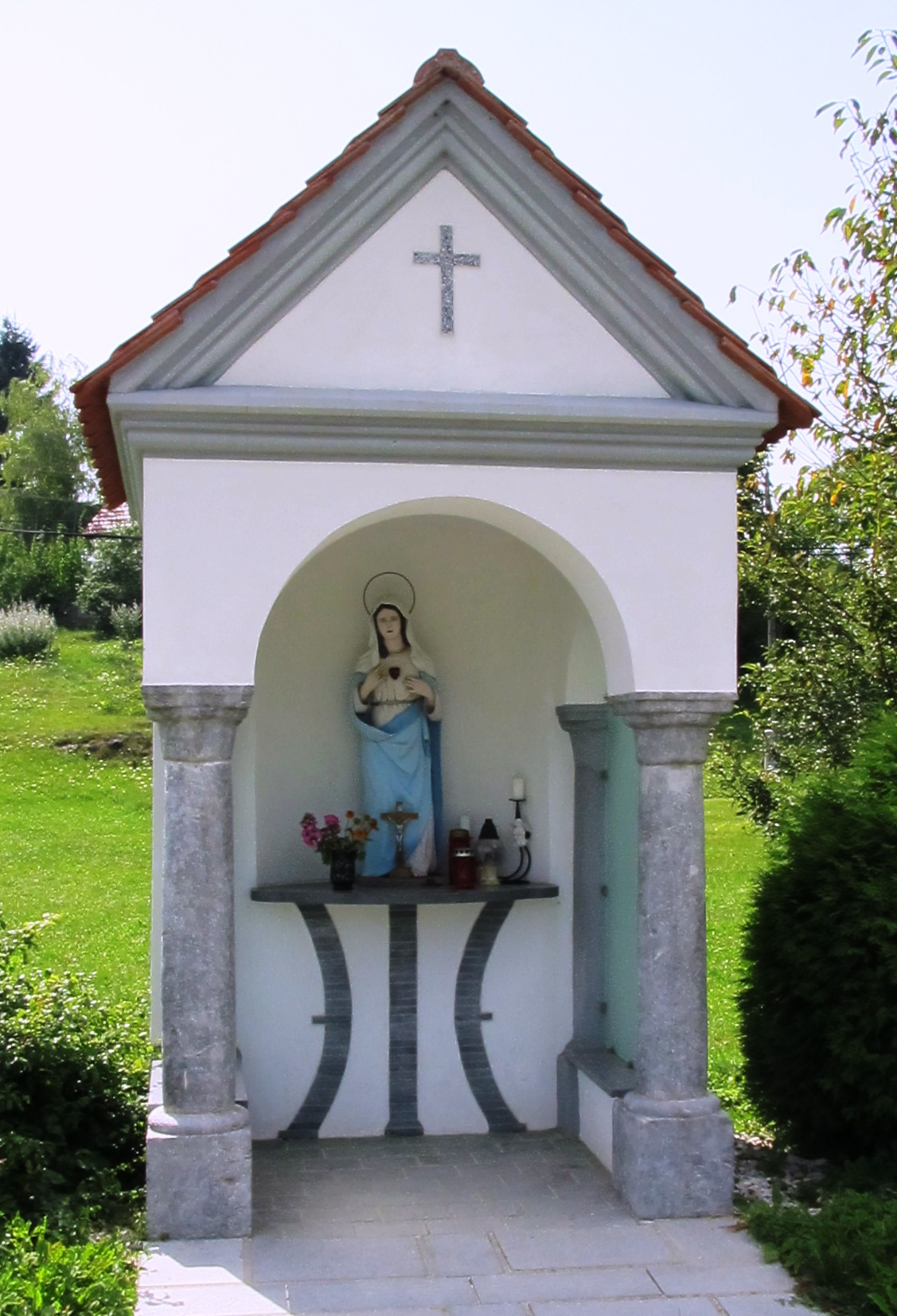
Chapel shrine in Zavratec

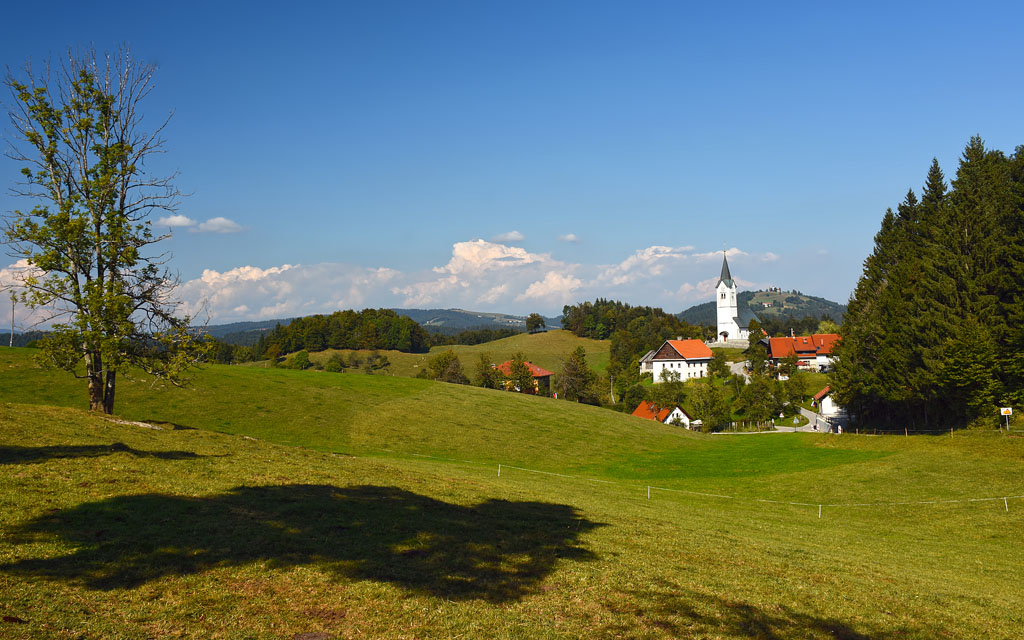
Zavratec With Saint Ulrich's Church
