= Vintarovci =

- Location in Slovenia
- Coordinates: 46°29′32.3″N 15°51′44.59″E
- Country: Slovenia
- Traditional region: Styria
- Statistical region: Drava
- Municipality: Destrnik

Area
  - Total: 3.1 km^{2} (1.2 sq mi)
- Elevation: 231 m (758 ft)

Population (2020)
  - Total: 405
  - Density: 130/km^{2} (340/sq mi)

Vintarovci (pronounced [ˈʋiːntaɾɔu̯tsi]) is a settlement in the Municipality of Destrnik in northeastern Slovenia. It lies in the hills just west of Destrnik. The area is part of the traditional region of Styria. The municipality is now included in the Drava Statistical Region.

There is a memorial to locals killed as soldiers in the First World War in the eastern part of the village in front of the Destrnik parish church. It has a 3 m obelisk and was erected in 1930.
