= Gomilci =

- Location in Slovenia
- Coordinates: 46°29′37.1″N 15°53′58.32″E
- Country: Slovenia
- Traditional region: Styria
- Statistical region: Drava
- Municipality: Destrnik

Area
  - Total: 1 km^{2} (0.39 sq mi)
- Elevation: 284 m (932 ft)

Population (2020)
  - Total: 61
  - Density: 61/km^{2} (160/sq mi)

Gomilci (pronounced [ɡɔˈmiːltsi]) is a small settlement in the Municipality of Destrnik in northeastern Slovenia. It lies in the hills just east of Destrnik on the edge of the Pesnica Valley. The area is part of the traditional region of Styria. The municipality is now included in the Drava Statistical Region.

Three 1st- to 2nd-century AD burial mounds have been identified near the settlement.
