= Ločki Vrh, Destrnik =

Ločki Vrh
- Location in Slovenia
- Coordinates: 46°30′18.78″N 15°52′47.24″E
- Country: Slovenia
- Traditional region: Styria
- Statistical region: Drava
- Municipality: Destrnik

Area
  - Total: 0.8 km^{2} (0.31 sq mi)
- Elevation: 335.5 m (1,101 ft)

Population (2020)
  - Total: 147
  - Density: 180/km^{2} (480/sq mi)

Ločki Vrh (pronounced [ˈloːtʃki ˈʋəɾx]) is a small settlement in the hills north of Destrnik in northeastern Slovenia. The area is part of the traditional region of Styria. The entire Municipality of Destrnik is now included in the Drava Statistical Region.

A small chapel-shrine in the settlement dates to 1875.
