= Zasadi, Destrnik =

Zasadi
- Location in Slovenia
- Coordinates: 46°29′50.68″N 15°52′37.88″E
- Country: Slovenia
- Traditional region: Styria
- Statistical region: Drava
- Municipality: Destrnik

Area
  - Total: 0.13 km^{2} (0.050 sq mi)
- Elevation: 352.2 m (1,156 ft)

Population (2020)
  - Total: 48
  - Density: 370/km^{2} (960/sq mi)

Zasadi (pronounced [ˈzaːsadi], German: Sasadi) is a small settlement immediately north of Destrnik in northeastern Slovenia. The area is part of the traditional region of Styria. The entire Municipality of Destrnik is now included in the Drava Statistical Region.
