= Strmec pri Destrniku =

- Location in Slovenia
- Coordinates: 46°30′7.18″N 15°51′14.65″E
- Country: Slovenia
- Traditional region: Styria
- Statistical region: Drava
- Municipality: Destrnik

Area
  - Total: 0.36 km^{2} (0.14 sq mi)
- Elevation: 349.4 m (1,146 ft)

Population (2020)
  - Total: 39
  - Density: 110/km^{2} (280/sq mi)

Strmec pri Destrniku (pronounced [ˈstəɾməts pɾi ˈdeːstəɾniku]) is a small settlement in the hills northwest of Destrnik in northeastern Slovenia. The area is part of the traditional region of Styria. The entire Municipality of Destrnik is now included in the Drava Statistical Region.
