= Desenci =

- Location in Slovenia
- Coordinates: 46°29′32.2″N 15°54′43.26″E
- Country: Slovenia
- Traditional region: Styria
- Statistical region: Drava
- Municipality: Destrnik

Area
  - Total: 1.41 km^{2} (0.54 sq mi)
- Elevation: 230.2 m (755 ft)

Population (2020)
  - Total: 36
  - Density: 26/km^{2} (66/sq mi)

Desenci (pronounced [ˈdeːsɛntsi]) is a small settlement in the Municipality of Destrnik in northeastern Slovenia. It lies in the Pesnica Valley. The area is part of the traditional region of Styria. The municipality is now included in the Drava Statistical Region.
