= Janežovci =

- Location in Slovenia
- Coordinates: 46°28′13.35″N 15°52′58.34″E
- Country: Slovenia
- Traditional region: Styria
- Statistical region: Drava
- Municipality: Destrnik

Area
  - Total: 2.12 km^{2} (0.82 sq mi)
- Elevation: 249.4 m (818 ft)

Population (2020)
  - Total: 99
  - Density: 47/km^{2} (120/sq mi)

Janežovci (pronounced [ˈjaːnɛʒɔu̯tsi]) is a settlement in the Municipality of Destrnik in northeastern Slovenia. It lies in the valley of Rogoznica Creek, a left tributary of the Drava River. The area is part of the traditional region of Styria. The municipality is now included in the Drava Statistical Region.
