= Municipality of Destrnik =

Municipality of Slovenia

Municipality of Destrnik Občina Destrnik
- Municipality
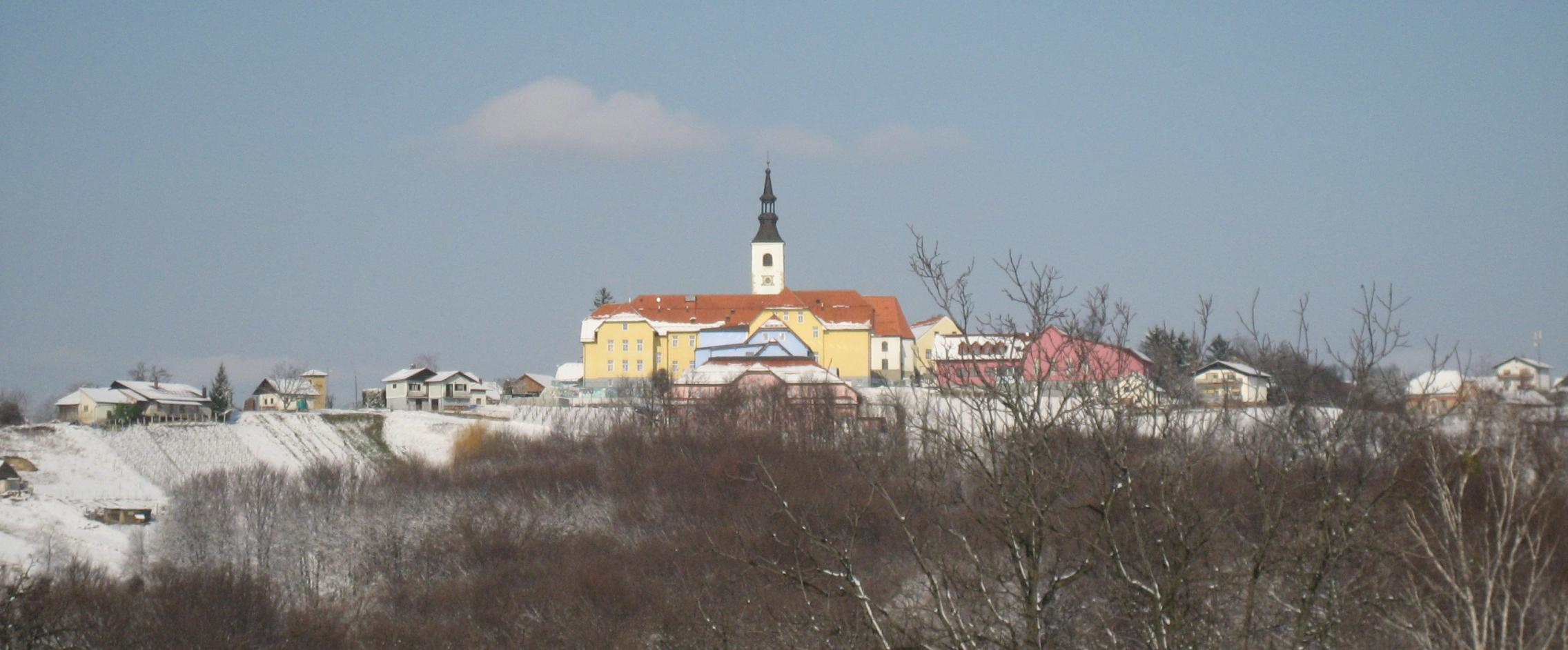

- Location of the Municipality of Destrnik in Slovenia
- Coordinates: 46°29′N 15°53′E
- Country: Slovenia

Government
  - Mayor: Branko Žvab (Independent)

Area
  - Total: 34.4 km^{2} (13.3 sq mi)

Population (2002)
  - Total: 2,496
  - Density: 72.6/km^{2} (188/sq mi)
- Time zone: UTC+01 (CET)
  - Summer (DST): UTC+02 (CEST)
- Website: www.destrnik.si

The Municipality of Destrnik (pronounced [ˈdeːstəɾnik]; Slovene: Občina Destrnik) is a municipality in northeastern Slovenia. The seat of the municipality is the settlement of Destrnik. It lies in the Slovene Hills (Slovene: Slovenske gorice) north of Ptuj. The area is part of the traditional region of Styria. It is now included in the Drava Statistical Region.

== Settlements ==
In addition to the municipal seat of Destrnik, the municipality also includes the following settlements:

- Desenci
- Dolič
- Drstelja
- Gomila
- Gomilci
- Janežovci
- Janežovski Vrh
- Jiršovci
- Levanjci
- Ločki Vrh
- Placar
- Strmec pri Destrniku
- Svetinci
- Vintarovci
- Zasadi
- Zgornji Velovlek
