= Zgornji Velovlek =

- Location in Slovenia
- Coordinates: 46°28′22.31″N 15°54′34.59″E
- Country: Slovenia
- Traditional region: Styria
- Statistical region: Drava
- Municipality: Destrnik

Area
  - Total: 2.55 km^{2} (0.98 sq mi)
- Elevation: 239.1 m (784 ft)

Population (2020)
  - Total: 95
  - Density: 37/km^{2} (96/sq mi)

Zgornji Velovlek (pronounced [ˈzɡoːɾnji ʋɛˈloːu̯lɛk]) is a settlement in the Municipality of Destrnik in northeastern Slovenia. The area is part of the traditional region of Styria. The municipality is now included in the Drava Statistical Region.

== Name ==
The name Zgornji Velovlek literally means 'upper Velovlek', contrasting with the neighboring village of Spodnji Velovlek (literally, 'lower Velovlek'). Zgornji Velovlek stands about 5 meters (16 ft) higher in elevation than Spodnji Velovlek.

== Cultural heritage ==
There is a small chapel-shrine with a wooden belfry on the regional road from Ptuj to Lenart v Slovenskih Goricah in the settlement. It dates to the early 20th century.

There are a number of Roman-period burial mounds in the area of the settlement.
