= Gomila, Destrnik =

Gomila
- Location in Slovenia
- Coordinates: 46°29′41.4″N 15°49′29.19″E
- Country: Slovenia
- Traditional region: Styria
- Statistical region: Drava
- Municipality: Destrnik

Area
  - Total: 0.75 km^{2} (0.29 sq mi)
- Elevation: 361.9 m (1,187 ft)

Population (2020)
  - Total: 78
  - Density: 100/km^{2} (270/sq mi)

Gomila (pronounced [ɡɔˈmiːla]) is a settlement in the Municipality of Destrnik in northeastern Slovenia. The area is part of the traditional region of Styria. The municipality is now included in the Drava Statistical Region.

A Roman period burial ground with twelve burial mounds has been identified near the settlement.
