= Placar, Destrnik =

Placar
- Location in Slovenia
- Coordinates: 46°27′38.57″N 15°53′14.65″E
- Country: Slovenia
- Traditional region: Styria
- Statistical region: Drava
- Municipality: Destrnik

Area
  - Total: 3.78 km^{2} (1.46 sq mi)
- Elevation: 250.9 m (823 ft)

Population (2020)
  - Total: 280
  - Density: 74/km^{2} (190/sq mi)

Placar (pronounced [ˈplaːtsaɾ]) is a settlement north of Ptuj in northeastern Slovenia. It is part of the Municipality of Destrnik. The area is part of the traditional region of Styria and is now part of the Drava Statistical Region.
