= Dole, Idrija =

Dole
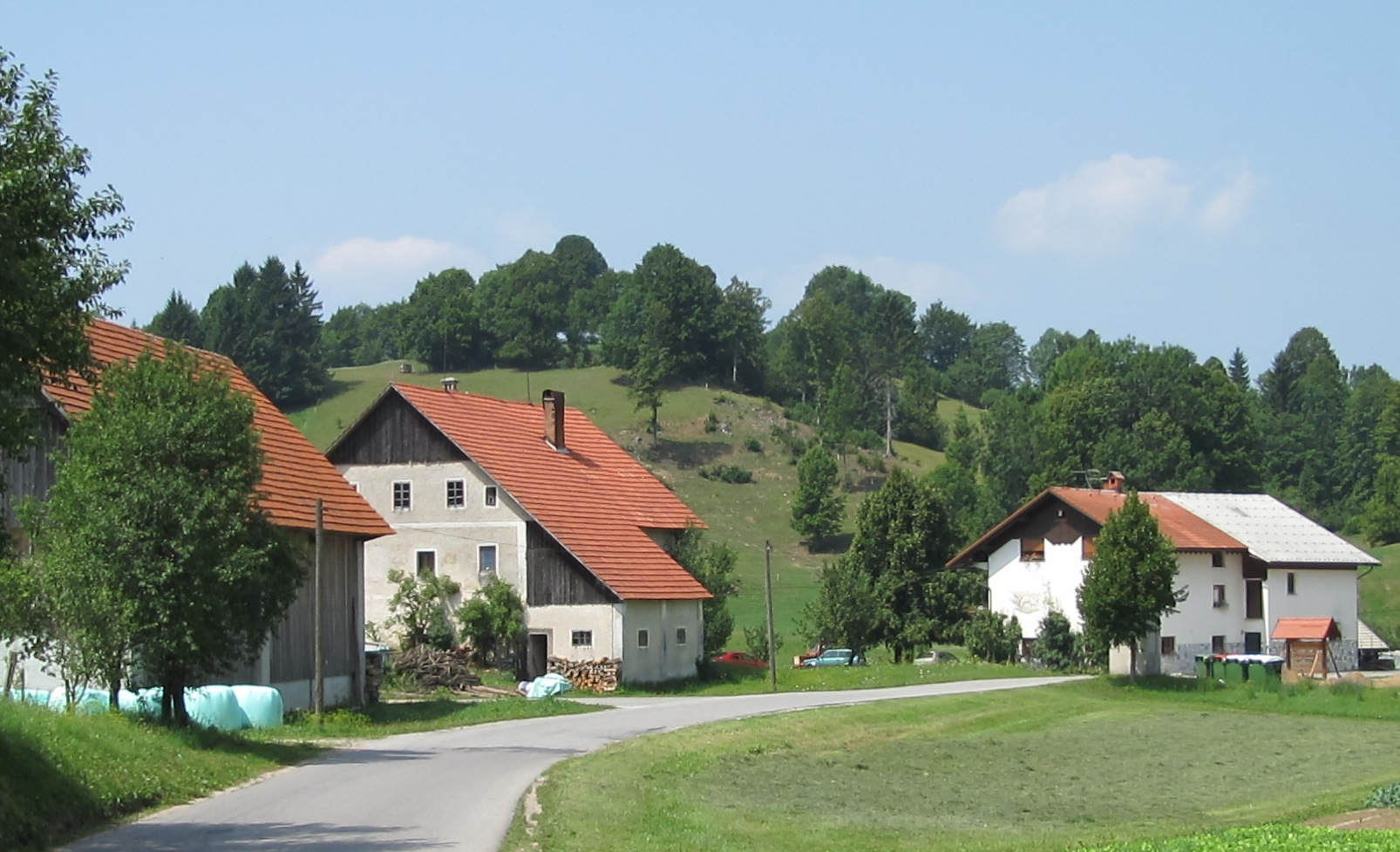

- Location in Slovenia
- Coordinates: 45°59′21.58″N 14°5′45.69″E
- Country: Slovenia
- Traditional region: Inner Carniola
- Statistical region: Gorizia
- Municipality: Idrija

Area
  - Total: 9.42 km^{2} (3.64 sq mi)
- Elevation: 784.1 m (2,573 ft)

Population (2002)
  - Total: 131

Dole (pronounced [ˈdoːlɛ]; German: Dolech) is a settlement in the hills east of Idrija in the traditional Inner Carniola region of Slovenia. (Note: Like other localities in the western part of Inner Carniola, Dole is now popularly perceived as being part of the Littoral.) It includes the formerly independent settlement of Črna, which was annexed in 1964.

== Name ==
Dole was attested in historical sources as Dolech in 1500. Like related names (e.g., Dol, Dolje, and Dolič), the name is derived from the common noun dol 'small valley', referring to a local geographical feature.

== Geography ==
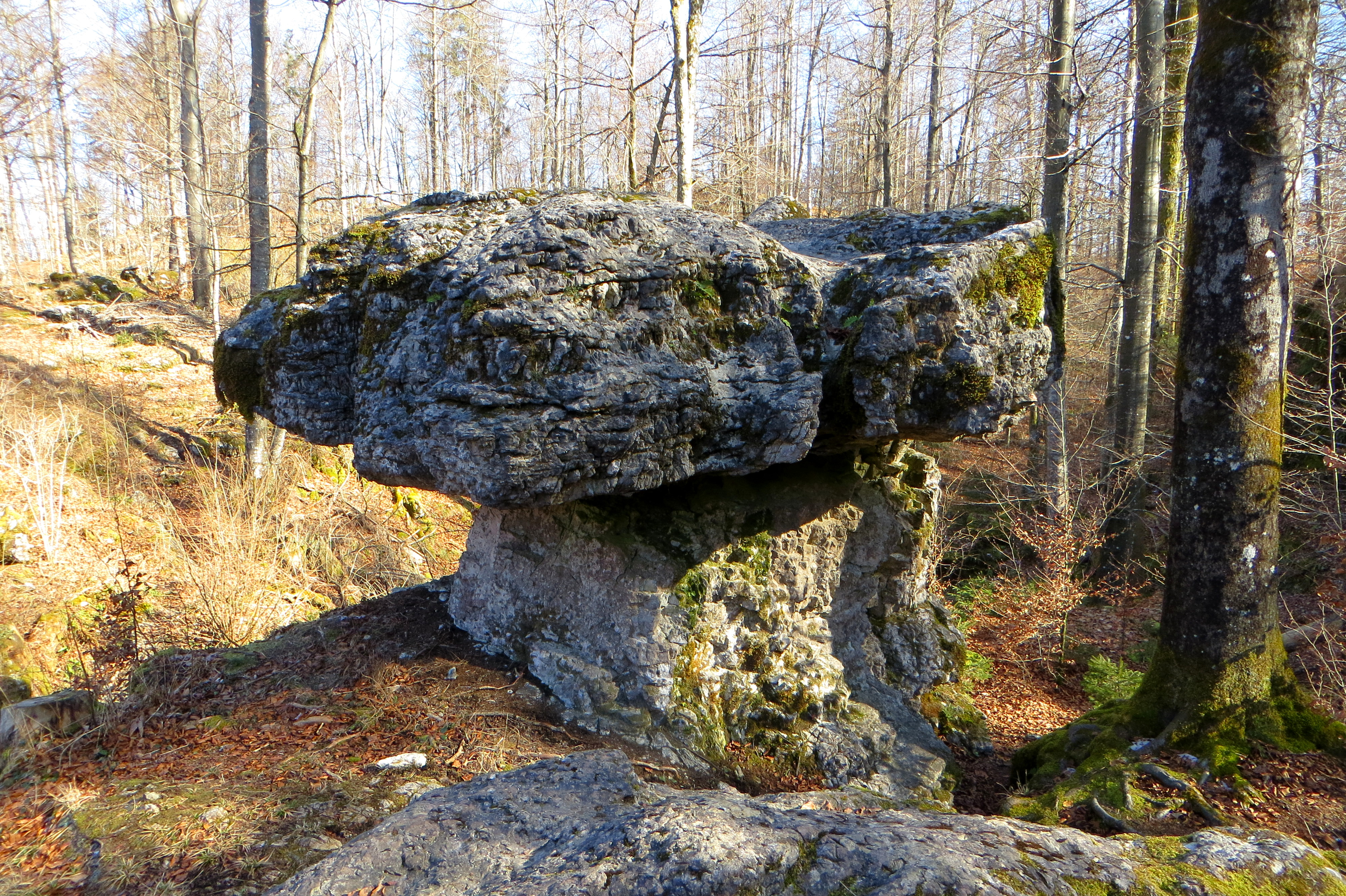
Tomaž's Table

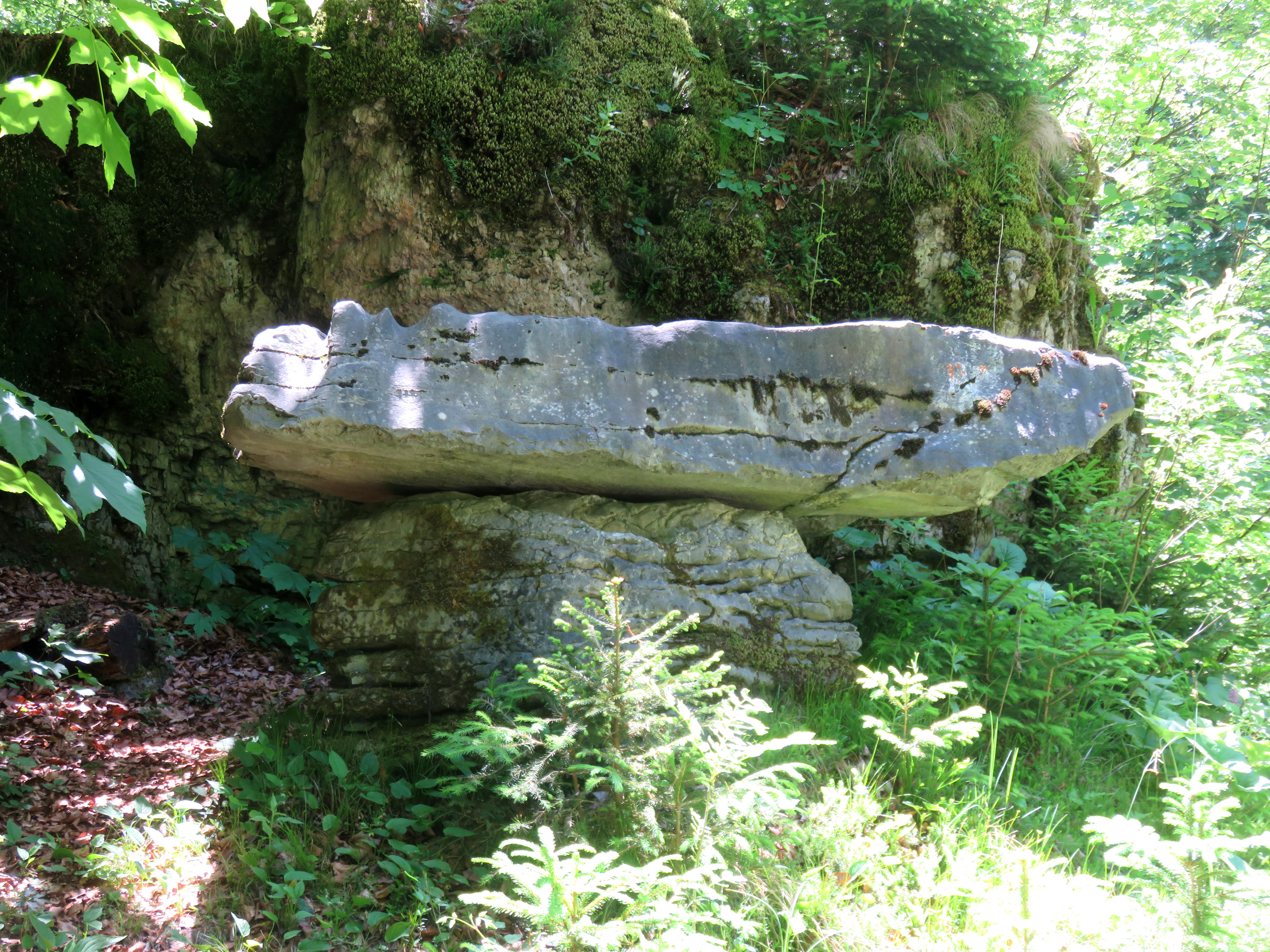
Little Stone Table

Dole consists of clusters of houses and various isolated farms along the road from Idrija to Medvedje Brdo. The landscape around the hamlet of Dolenje Dole has rolling terrain with tilled fields and small meadows, and the land around the hamlet of Gorenje Dole has sinkholes and an intermittent spring. In the northern part of the village's territory, just west of the neighboring village of Ravne pri Žireh, there is a geological curiosity known as Tomaž's Table (Slovene: Tomaževa miza). It consists of a block of dolomitized limestone on which a slab of the same material was deposited; the slab is about 1 meter (3 ft 3 in) thick and is estimated to weigh 30 metric tons (33 short tons). A similar formation, known as the Little Stone Table (Slovene: Mala kamnita miza), is located about 670 meters (2,200 ft) to the southeast.
