= Jiršovci =

- Location in Slovenia
- Coordinates: 46°29′50.5″N 15°50′53.28″E
- Country: Slovenia
- Traditional region: Styria
- Statistical region: Drava
- Municipality: Destrnik

Area
  - Total: 4.79 km^{2} (1.85 sq mi)
- Elevation: 347.4 m (1,140 ft)

Population (2020)
  - Total: 258
  - Density: 53.9/km^{2} (140/sq mi)

Jiršovci (pronounced [ˈjiːɾʃɔu̯tsi]) is a settlement in the Municipality of Destrnik in northeastern Slovenia. It lies in the hills surrounding the valley in the upper course of Rogoznica Creek, a minor left tributary of the Drava River. The area is part of the traditional region of Styria. The municipality is now included in the Drava Statistical Region.

A small chapel-shrine in the settlement dates to the late 19th century.
