= Levanjci =

- Location in Slovenia
- Coordinates: 46°29′5.34″N 15°54′40.47″E
- Country: Slovenia
- Traditional region: Styria
- Statistical region: Drava
- Municipality: Destrnik

Area
  - Total: 4.32 km^{2} (1.67 sq mi)
- Elevation: 230 m (750 ft)

Population (2020)
  - Total: 136
  - Density: 31.5/km^{2} (81.5/sq mi)

Levanjci (pronounced [lɛˈʋaːntsi]) is a settlement in the Municipality of Destrnik in northeastern Slovenia. It lies on the edge of the Pesnica Valley. The area is part of the traditional region of Styria. The whole municipality is now included in the Drava Statistical Region.

Four Roman period burial mounds have been identified near the settlement.
