= Dolič, Destrnik =

Dolič
- Location in Slovenia
- Coordinates: 46°29′3.01″N 15°53′26.34″E
- Country: Slovenia
- Traditional region: Styria
- Statistical region: Drava
- Municipality: Destrnik

Area
  - Total: 1.38 km^{2} (0.53 sq mi)
- Elevation: 317.4 m (1,041 ft)

Population (2020)
  - Total: 161
  - Density: 117/km^{2} (302/sq mi)

Dolič (pronounced [ˈdoːlitʃ]) is a settlement in the Municipality of Destrnik in northeastern Slovenia. It lies just south of Destrnik on the regional road from Ptuj to Lenart v Slovenskih Goricah. The area is part of the traditional region of Styria. The municipality is now included in the Drava Statistical Region.
