= Matija Murko =

Slovenian philologist and linguist (1861–1952)

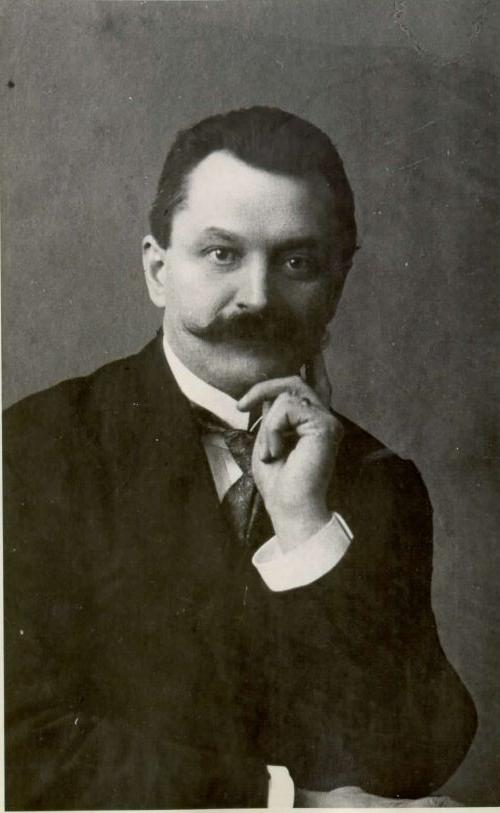
Matija Murko in 1895

Matija Murko (10 February 1861 – 11 February 1952), also known as Mathias Murko, was a Slovenian philologist and linguist, known mostly for his work on oral epic traditions in Serbian, Bosnian and Croatian.

== Life ==
Murko was born on 10 February 1861 in the small village of Drstelja near Ptuj, Lower Styria, in what was then the Austrian Empire and is now in Slovenia, and baptized Mathias Murko. He attended high school in Ptuj and Maribor. He studied Slavic and Germanic philology at the University of Vienna, where he was a pupil of Franz Miklosich. After obtaining his PhD in Vienna in 1886, he went for postdoctoral studies to Moscow. From 1897 to 1902, he taught Slavic philology at the University of Vienna, from 1902 to 1917 at the University of Graz, and from 1917 to 1920 at the University of Leipzig. From 1920 to 1931, he taught at Charles University in Prague, where he settled and lived until his death in 1952. At the Charles University he founded the Slavic Institute (Slovanský ústav), which he led until 1941.

Murko had an intense social life and was a personal friend of figures as Ivan Hribar, Tomáš Garrigue Masaryk and Karel Kramář. During his lifetime, he became a member of numerous academies of sciences around Europe, especially in Slavic countries: the Yugoslav, the Serbian, the Czech, the Soviet, the Bulgarian, the Polish and the Slovenian. He received a doctorate honoris causa from Charles University in Prague in 1909 and from the University of Ljubljana in 1951.

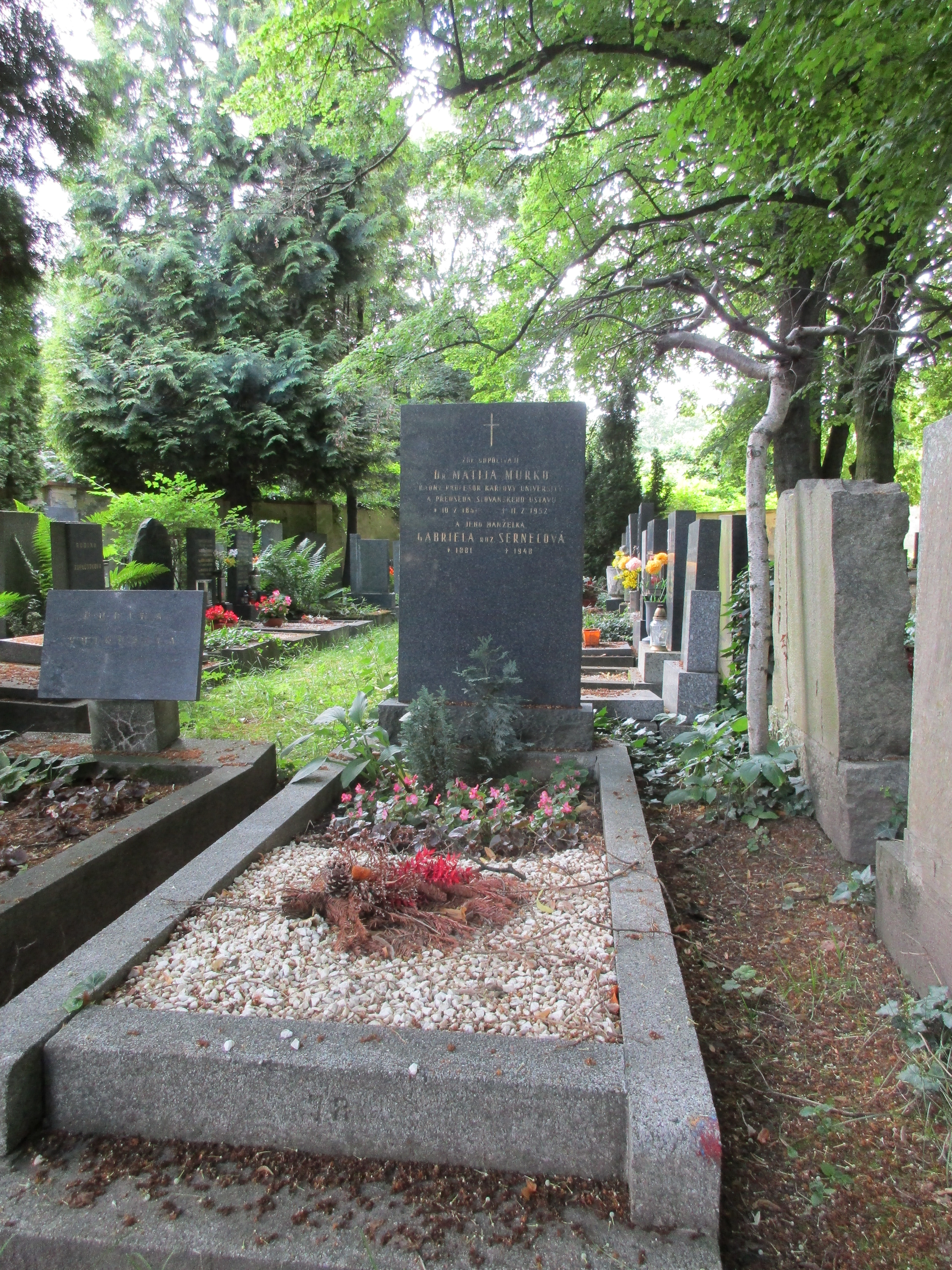
Murko's grave in Vokovice, Prague

== Work and influence ==
Murko was trained in the positivistic style of philology. He published several scientific works in the field of ethnology, cultural and literary history. Influenced by the historian Karl Lamprecht, Murko published the book Geschichte der aeltern slawischen Literaturen ("History of Ancient Slavic Literatures", Leipzig, 1908), in which he presented the older Slavic literatures as a reflection of their collective cultural and social life of those people. He also wrote on the history of Slovenian literature, especially on Prešeren and Protestant authors from the 16th century, such as Primož Trubar, Jurij Dalmatin and Sebastijan Krelj.

Since Murko published mostly in German and French, his work was little known to scholars unfamiliar with these languages, but it had an important influence on Milman Parry, who was studying for his doctorate at the Sorbonne in Paris under Antoine Meillet, at the time when Murko's major work appeared in French.

His work was praised by the renowned Austrian critic Hermann Bahr, who regarded it as one of the finest examples of style in contemporary scientific prose. Murko also influenced the development of modern Slovenian literary history, especially Fran Ilešič, Ivan Prijatelj, and France Kidrič.

== Sources ==
- Jan Kollár (Ljubljana: Slovenska matica, 1894).
- Deutsche Einflüsse auf die Anfänge der Slavischen Romantik ("German Influences on Slavic Romanticism", Graz, 1897).
- Die südslavischen Literaturen: die Kultur der Gegenwart ("The South Slavic Literatures: the Culture of the Present", Stuttgart, 1908).
- Geschichte der ältern slawischen Literaturen ("History of Ancient Slavic Literatures", Leipzig, 1908).
- Die Bedeutung der Reformation und Gegenreformation für das geistlige Leben der Südslaven ("The Importance of the Protestant Reformation and Counter-Reformation in the Spiritual History of South Slavs", Prague: Slavia, 1925; Heidelberg, 1926).
- La poésie populaire épique en Yougoslavie au début du XXe siècle ("The Folk Epic Poetry in Yugoslavia at the Beginning of the 20th Century", Paris: Champion, 1929)
- Tragom srpskohrvatske epike ("Tracing the Serbo-Croatian Epic Literature", Zagreb, 1951).
- Izbrano delo ("Selected Works", edited by Anton Slodnjak, Ljubljana, 1962).

== Sources ==
- Lord, Albert Bates (1960), The Singer of Tales, Cambridge, MA: Harvard University Press, pp. 11–12.
- Dalby, Andrew (2006), Rediscovering Homer, New York: Norton, ISBN 0-393-05788-7, pp. 186–187.
- Janko Kos et al. (1982), written at Ljubljana, Slovenska književnost, Cankarjeva založba, pp. 239–240.
