= Svetinci =

- Location in Slovenia
- Coordinates: 46°29′45.77″N 15°53′25.64″E
- Country: Slovenia
- Traditional region: Styria
- Statistical region: Drava
- Municipality: Destrnik

Area
  - Total: 2.9 km^{2} (1.1 sq mi)
- Elevation: 267.2 m (877 ft)

Population (2020)
  - Total: 130
  - Density: 45/km^{2} (120/sq mi)

Svetinci (pronounced [ˈsʋeːtintsi], German: Swetinzen) is a settlement in the Municipality of Destrnik in northeastern Slovenia. The area is part of the traditional region of Styria. The municipality is now included in the Drava Statistical Region.

There are two small chapel-shrines in the settlement. Both date to the early 20th century.
