= Spodnji Velovlek =

- Location in Slovenia
- Coordinates: 46°27′52.85″N 15°55′13.47″E
- Country: Slovenia
- Traditional region: Styria
- Statistical region: Drava
- Municipality: Ptuj

Area
  - Total: 4.07 km^{2} (1.57 sq mi)
- Elevation: 228 m (748 ft)

Population (2002)
  - Total: 220

Spodnji Velovlek (pronounced [ˈspoːdnji ʋɛˈloːu̯lɛk]) is a settlement on the right bank of the Pesnica River in the City Municipality of Ptuj in northeastern Slovenia. The area is part of the traditional region of Styria. It is now included with the rest of the municipality in the Drava Statistical Region.

== Name ==
The name Spodnji Velovlek literally means 'lower Velovlek', contrasting with the neighboring village of Zgornji Velovlek (literally, 'upper Velovlek'). Spodnji Velovlek stands about 5 meters (16 ft) lower in elevation than Zgornji Velovlek.
