= Črna pri Kamniku =

Črna pri Kamniku Prapretno-Sv. Primož (until 1955)
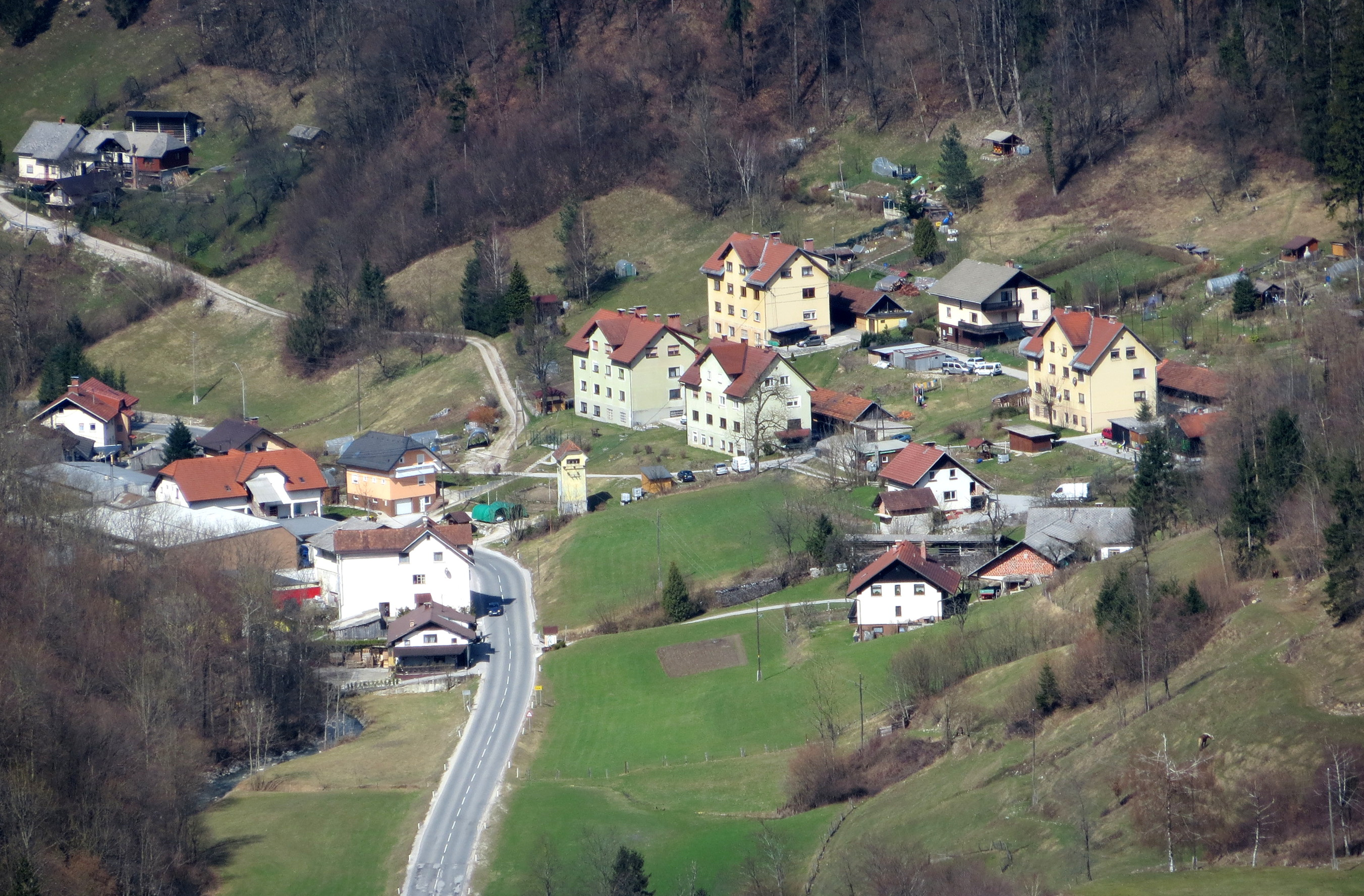

- Location in Slovenia
- Coordinates: 46°16′12.1″N 14°37′25.53″E
- Country: Slovenia
- Traditional region: Upper Carniola
- Statistical region: Central Slovenia
- Municipality: Kamnik
- Elevation: 708.3 m (2,324 ft)

Population (2002)
  - Total: 206

Črna pri Kamniku (pronounced [ˈtʃəɾna pɾi ˈkaːmniku]; German: Tscherna) is a village in the Municipality of Kamnik in the Upper Carniola region of Slovenia.

== Name ==
The name of the settlement was changed from Prapretno-Sv. Primož (literally, 'Prapretno–Saint Primus') to Črna pri Kamniku (literally, 'black (village) near Kamnik') in 1955. The name was changed on the basis of the 1948 Law on Names of Settlements and Designations of Squares, Streets, and Buildings as part of efforts by Slovenia's postwar communist government to remove religious elements from toponyms. In the past the German name was Tscherna.

== History ==
The area used to be known for its kaolin mine, which operated between 1856 and 1990. Črna was also the location for the mass execution of fifty local hostages on 8 July 1942 by Nazi soldiers as retribution for a Partisan attack on two of their numbers. A memorial to the victims of this event can be seen outside the abandoned mine.

== Churches ==
On a hill above the village is a pilgrimage centre with two churches. The main church is dedicated to Saints Primus and Felicianus and has a Romanesque design, although it was rebuilt in the 15th century and various additions were built at later stages. It has a double nave, unusual for this area, and frescos on the interior. The frescoes are particularly interesting as the scenes are set in real landscapes and much detail is given to clothes and expressions. A smaller, single nave, Gothic church, dedicated to Saint Peter, stands further up the hill. It contains a wooden painted ceiling dated to 1475 in the nave, although it is in very poor condition, and three 17th-century gilded altars dedicated to Saint Peter, Saint Lucy, and Saint Laurence.

== Gallery ==
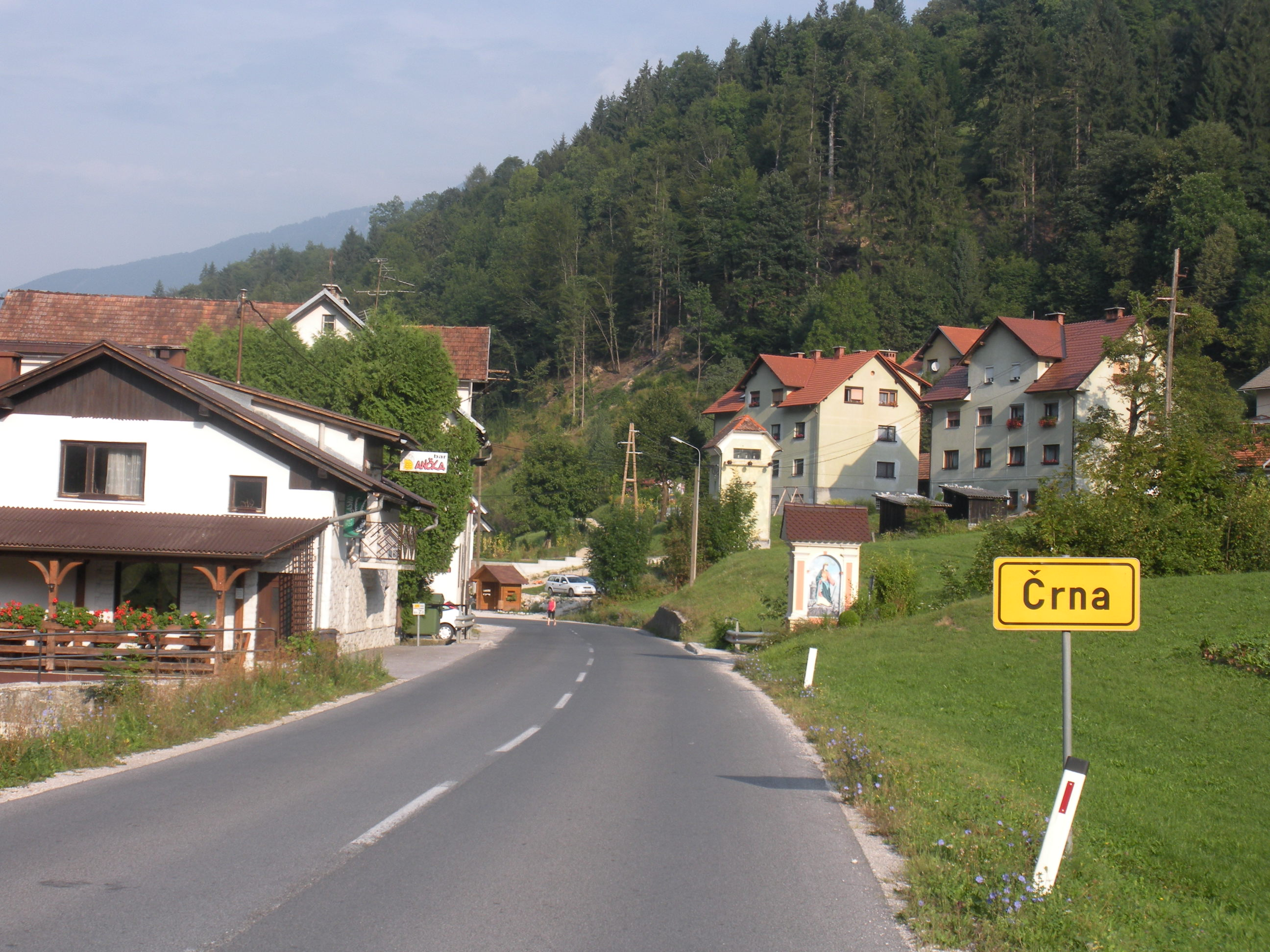
Črna pri Kamniku from the east

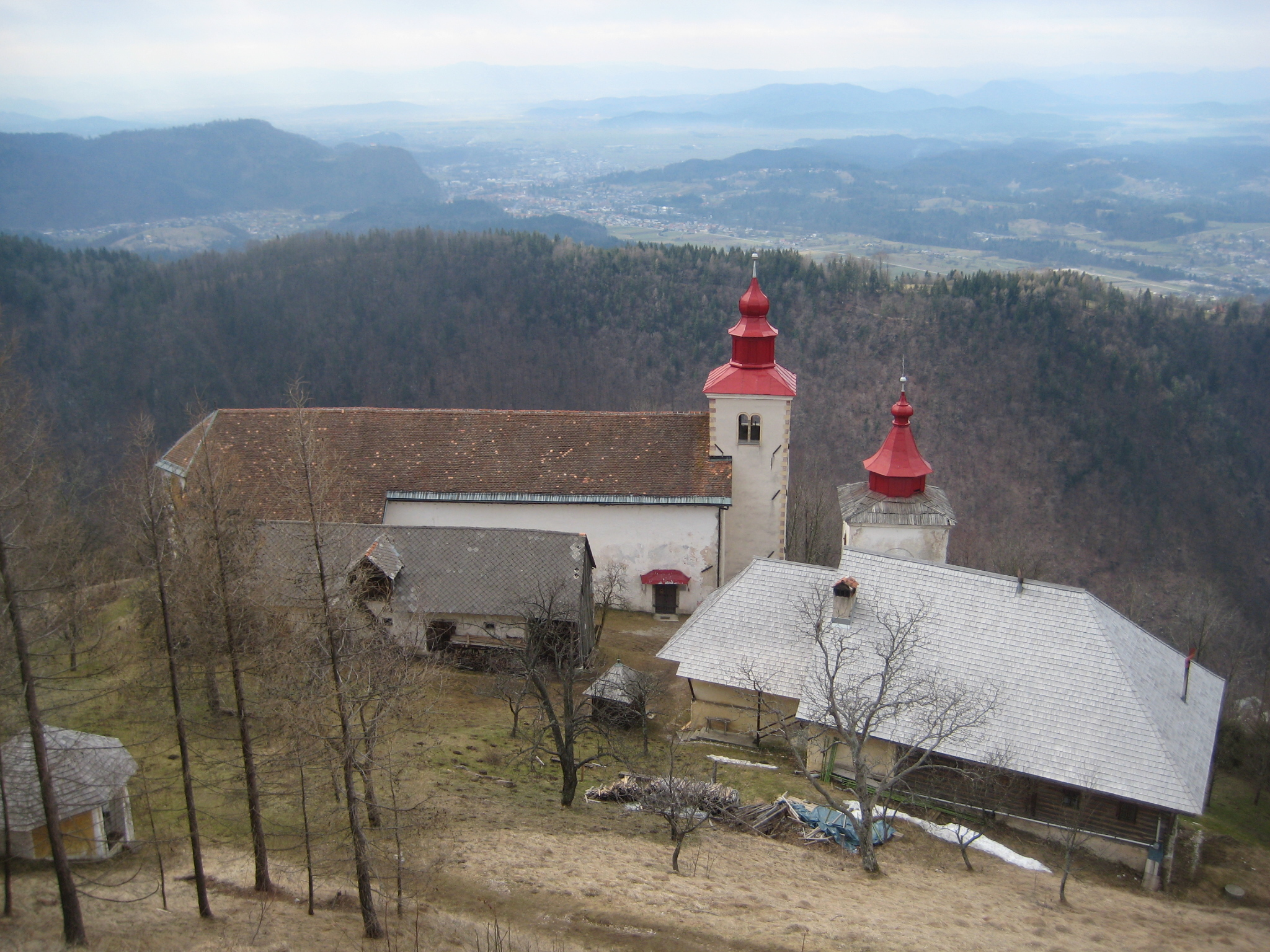
St. Primus churches from above

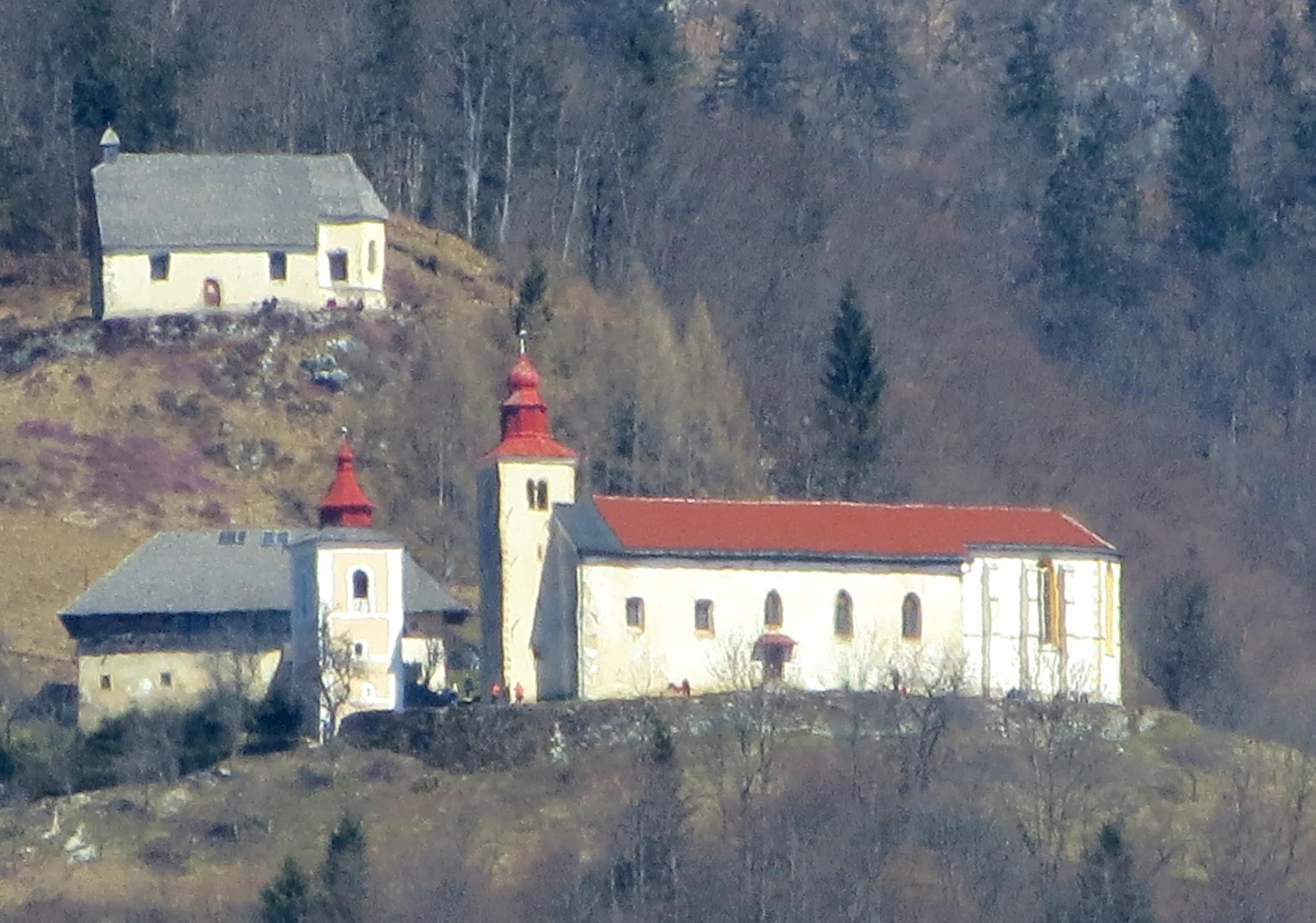
St. Primus churches from Kamnik
