= Drstelja =

- Location in Slovenia
- Coordinates: 46°28′22.17″N 15°51′27.58″E
- Country: Slovenia
- Traditional region: Styria
- Statistical region: Drava
- Municipality: Destrnik

Area
  - Total: 2.85 km^{2} (1.10 sq mi)
- Elevation: 284.8 m (934 ft)

Population (2020)
  - Total: 229
  - Density: 80.4/km^{2} (208/sq mi)

Drstelja (pronounced [dəɾˈstɛːlja] or [dəɾˈsteːlja]) is a settlement in the Municipality of Destrnik in northeastern Slovenia. The area is part of the traditional region of Styria. The municipality is now included in the Drava Statistical Region.

A small roadside chapel-shrine in the settlement dates to the early 20th century. The priest and poet Matija Murko (1861–1952) was born in Drstelja.
