= Janežovski Vrh =

- Location in Slovenia
- Coordinates: 46°28′56.53″N 15°52′44.98″E
- Country: Slovenia
- Traditional region: Styria
- Statistical region: Drava
- Municipality: Destrnik

Area
  - Total: 1.49 km^{2} (0.58 sq mi)
- Elevation: 313.8 m (1,030 ft)

Population (2020)
  - Total: 255
  - Density: 171/km^{2} (443/sq mi)

Janežovski Vrh (pronounced [ˈjaːnɛʒɔu̯ski ˈʋəɾx], German: Janschenberg) is a settlement in the Municipality of Destrnik in northeastern Slovenia. The entire municipality is included in the Drava Statistical Region. The area is part of the traditional region of Styria.
