= Črna, Idrija =

Črna
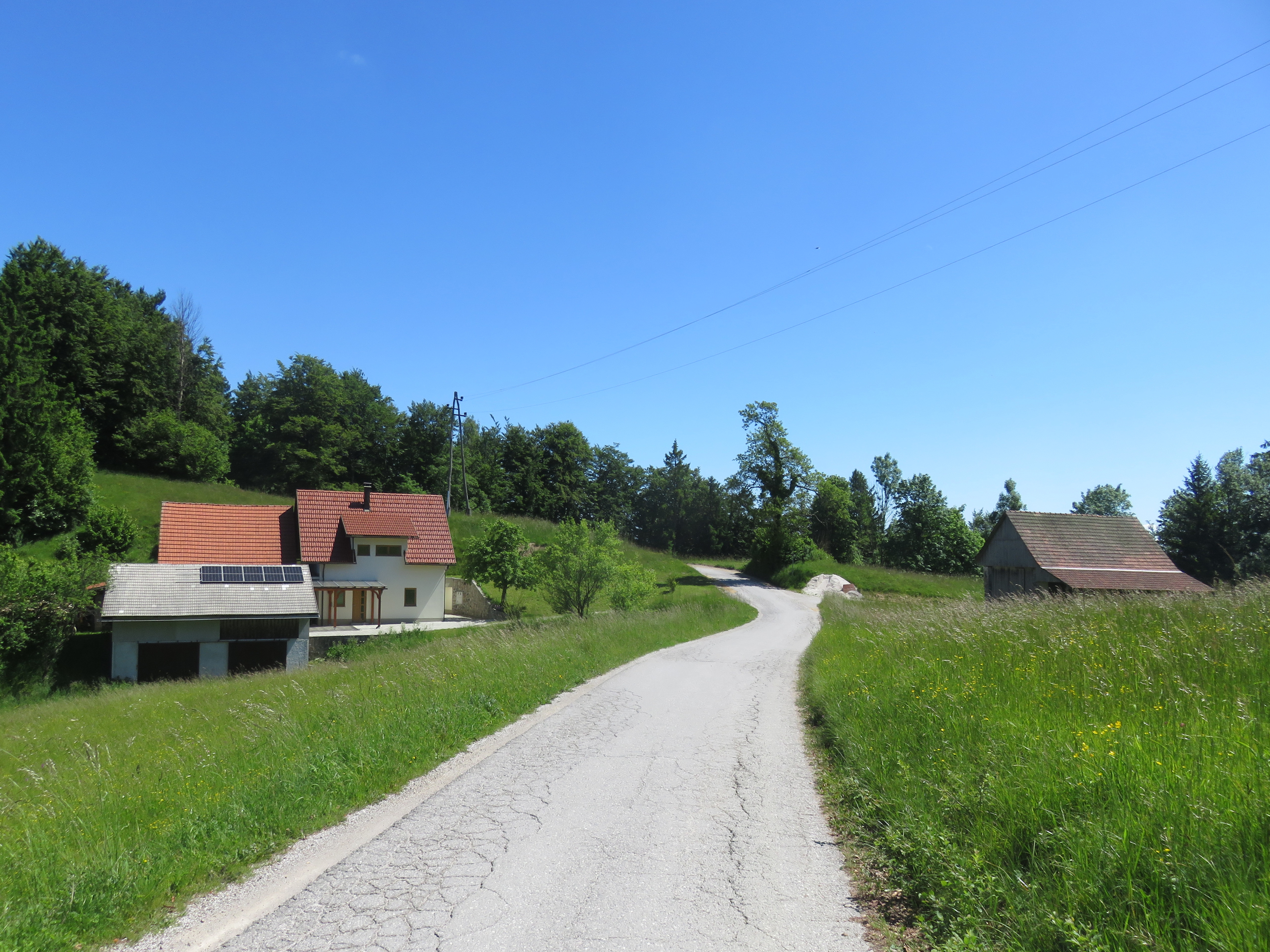

- Location in Slovenia
- Coordinates: 45°59′36″N 14°06′23″E
- Country: Slovenia
- Traditional region: Inner Carniola
- Statistical region: Gorizia
- Municipality: Idrija
- Elevation: 851 m (2,792 ft)

Črna (pronounced [ˈtʃəɾna]; German: Tscherna) is a formerly independent settlement in the eastern part of Dole in central Slovenia. It is part of the traditional region of Inner Carniola and is now included with the rest of the municipality in the Gorizia Statistical Region.

== Geography ==
Črna lies in a set of clearings on a slope below Rupe Hill. The surrounding forest is a mix of spruce and beech. Black Gorge (Slovene: Črna grapa) lies below the settlement and Black Creek (Slovene: Črna) flows through the gorge.

== History ==
In 1880 Črna had a population of 19 people living in three houses. By 1900, there were only 13 people, and by 1961 the population had declined to nine; this fell further to only five in 1965. At the time, the settlement consisted of only three farms, one of which had been abandoned. Črna was annexed by Dole in 1964, ending its existence as an independent settlement. There was formerly a mill along Black Creek below the settlement; the remnants of a weir and a footbridge remain at the site.
