= Destrnik =

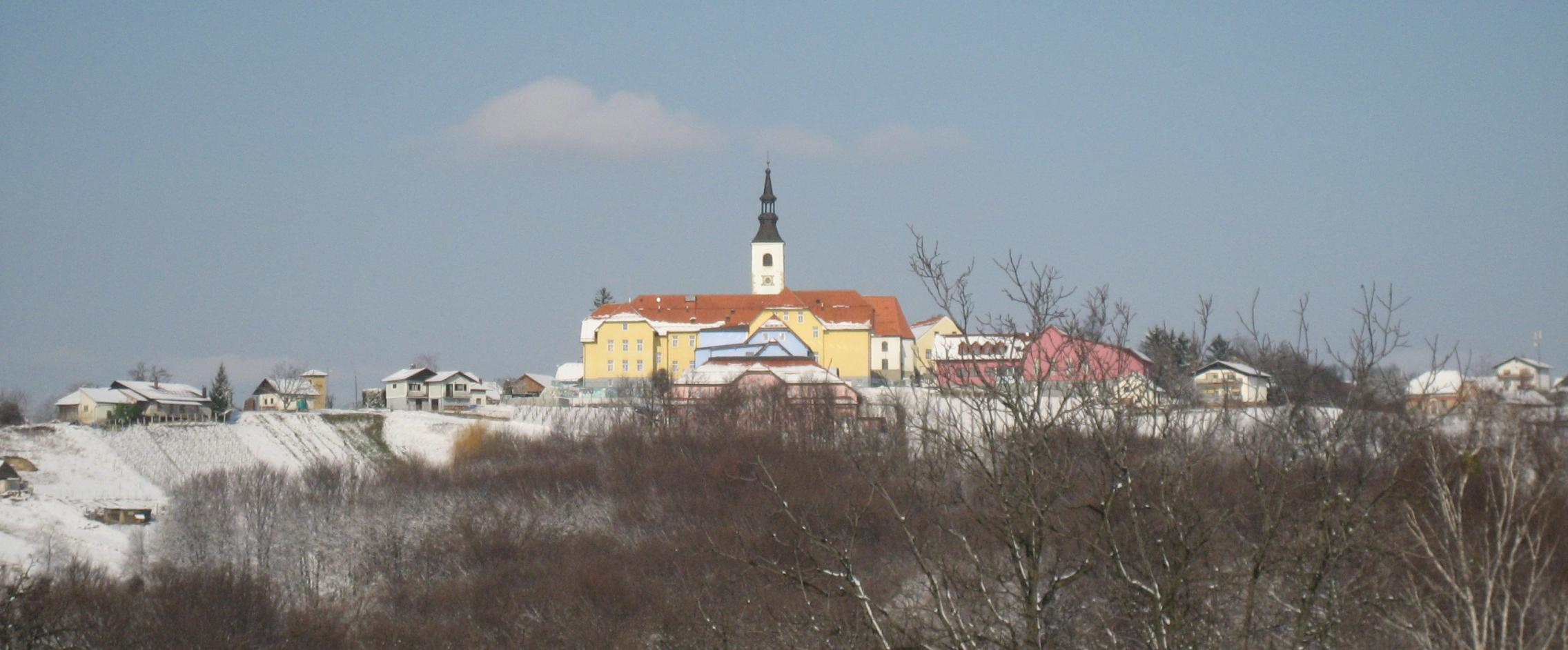
- St. Urban's Church in Destrnik. The yellow buildings and the rest of the foreground is in the settlement of Janežovski Vrh.

- Location in Slovenia
- Coordinates: 46°29′32.13″N 15°52′48.36″E
- Country: Slovenia
- Traditional region: Styria
- Statistical region: Drava
- Municipality: Destrnik

Area
  - Total: 0.6 km^{2} (0.23 sq mi)
- Elevation: 339.7 m (1,115 ft)

Population (2020)
  - Total: 186
  - Density: 310/km^{2} (800/sq mi)

Destrnik (pronounced [ˈdeːstəɾnik], German: Desternigberg) is a settlement in northeastern Slovenia. It is the seat of the Municipality of Destrnik. It lies in the Slovene Hills (Slovene: Slovenske gorice) north of Ptuj. The area is part of the traditional region of Styria. It is now included in the Drava Statistical Region.

== Name ==
Destrnik was first attested in written sources in 1398 and 1441 as Terstenik, and as Dersternikh in 1495. The name is believed to derive from *Drstenik and, like similar names (e.g., Drstelja), is presumably based on the Slovene common noun drsten 'broken stone, rubble, scree'.

== Church ==
The local parish church, built on the highest point in the settlement, dominates its landscape and appears in the municipal coat of arms. It is dedicated to Saint Urban and belongs to the Roman Catholic Archdiocese of Maribor. It dates to the 16th century with 18th-century adaptations. The feast day of Saint Urban, 25 May, has also been chosen as the official municipal holiday.
