= Dol =

Dol may refer to:

== Places ==
- Dol-de-Bretagne, a commune in the Ille-et-Vilaine département, France
- Mont-Dol, a commune in the Ille-et-Vilaine département, France
- Dol pri Borovnici, a village in Borovnica municipality, Slovenia
- Dol, Črnomelj, a village in Črnomelj municipality, Slovenia
- Dol pri Hrastniku, a village in Hrastnik municipality, Slovenia
- Dol pri Hrastovljah, a village in the municipality of Koper, Slovenia
- Dol pri Laškem, a village in Laško municipality, Slovenia
- Dol pri Ljubljani, a municipality near Ljubljana, Slovenia
- Dol pri Stopercah, a village in Majšperk municipality, Slovenia
- Dol pri Vogljah, a village in Sežana municipality, Slovenia
- Dol, Stari Grad, a village on the Croatian island of Hvar
- Dol, Brač, a village near Postira on the Croatian island of Brač
- Mali Dol, a village near Kraljevica, Croatia
- Dugi Dol, a village near Krnjak, Croatia
- Dol, Krašić, a village near Krašić, Croatia
- Dol, Visoko, a village near Visoko, Bosnia and Herzegovina
- Dół, Poland

== Other ==
- Dol (film), a 2007 Kurdish film
- A little-used unit of measurement for pain; see pain scale
  - Dolorimeter, pain measuring instrument
- Department of Labor
- Washington Department of Licensing, a group that issues various licenses in the US state of Washington
- Direct on line starter, a type of start associated with electric motors
- Dolichol, a lipid
- Doljanchi, a traditional Korean ceremony for celebrating a baby's first birthday
- Dol Purnima or Dolyatra, the Bengali variant of the Holi festival
- Dol or Dool, another slang for cannabis (mostly marijuana)
- Deprivation of liberty, one of the definitions of abuse within UK law
- An alternative transliteration of Dhol, an Indian drum

== See also ==
- DOL (disambiguation), as an acronym
- dole (disambiguation)
