= Dole =

Dole may refer to:

== Places ==
- Dole, Ceredigion, Wales
- Dole, Idrija, Slovenia
- Dole, Jura, France
  - Arrondissement of Dole
- Dole (Kladanj), a village at the entity line of Federation of Bosnia and Herzegovina-Republika Srpska
- Dole, Ljubuški, Bosnia and Herzegovina
- Dole, Metlika, southeastern Slovenia
- Dole, Nepal
- Dole, Šentjur, eastern Slovenia
- La Dôle, a mountain in Switzerland

== Other uses ==
- Dole (surname), including a list of people with the name
- Dole Constituency, a parliamentary constituency in Zanzibar
- Dole plc, a US agricultural corporation
- Dole (custom), a traditional distribution of goods to locals
- Unemployment benefits
- Welfare spending
  - Cura Annonae, Roman subsidized grain supply
- Charity (practice), giving food, clothing or money in England (mostly obsolete); examples include
- Department of Labor and Employment (Philippines)
- Dole Air Race, ill-fated 1927 air race

== See also ==
- Dhole
- Dhol
- Dule (disambiguation)
