= Phari Lapcha =

Mountain in Khumbu, Nepal

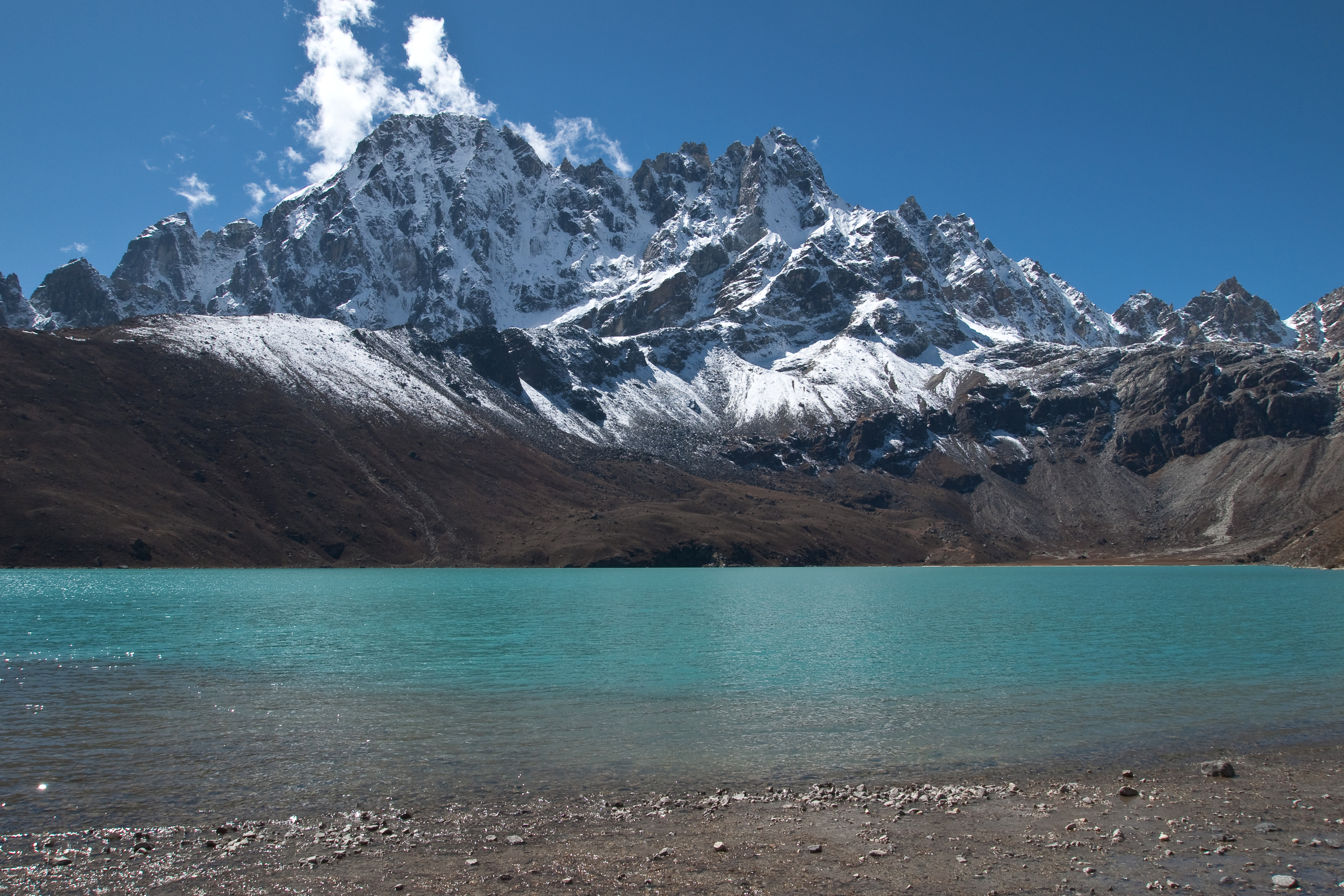
- Northeast aspect, seen from Dudh Pokhari

Highest point
- Elevation: 6,017 m (19,741 ft)
- Prominence: 467 m (1,532 ft)
- Parent peak: Kyazo Ri (6,151 m)
- Isolation: 2.4 km (1.5 mi)
- Coordinates: 27°55′45″N 86°40′51″E

Geography
- Location within Nepal
- Interactive map of Phari Lapcha
- Location: Khumbu
- Country: Nepal
- Province: Koshi
- District: Solukhumbu
- Protected area: Sagarmatha National Park
- Parent range: Himalaya; Mahalangur Himal

Climbing
- First ascent: 2003

Phari Lapcha is a mountain in Nepal.

== Description ==
Phari Lapcha, also known as Machhermo Peak, is a 6,017-metre (19,741-foot) summit in the Khumbu region of the Nepalese Himalaya. It is situated 24 kilometres (15 mi) west of Mount Everest and five kilometres (3.1 mi) northwest of Machhermo in the Gokyo Valley of Sagarmatha National Park. Topographic relief is significant as the summit rises over 1,300 metres (4,265 ft) above Tanjung Cho in two kilometres (1.2 mi). Precipitation runoff from the mountain's slopes drains into tributaries of the Dudh Koshi. Trekkers pass by this peak en route to Everest Base Camp. This peak is a popular climbing destination and was added to the list of permitted trekking peaks in 2002.

== Climate ==
Based on the Köppen climate classification, Phari Lapcha is located in a tundra climate zone with cold, snowy winters, and cool summers. Weather systems coming off the Bay of Bengal are forced upwards by the Himalaya mountains (orographic lift), causing heavy precipitation in the form of rainfall and snowfall. Mid-June through early-August is the monsoon season. This climate supports a small unnamed glacier on the peak's west slope. The months of April, May, September, and October offer the most favorable weather for viewing or climbing this peak.

== Climbing ==
The first permitted ascent of the summit was made on May 19, 2003, by Marcelo Belo, Juliana Belo, Viktor Groselj, Rafael Vodisek, Vlado Mesaric, Stipe Bozic, Josko Bozic, Vladimir Shataev, Isrofil Ashurly, Valentine Grakovith, Dinesh Devkota, and Nepalese Sherpas Pemba, Dawa, and Nima.

Established climbing routes:

- Polish Route – Northeast Face via the Central Couloir – (2008)
- Korean Route – class 5.9 – (2010)

== Gallery ==
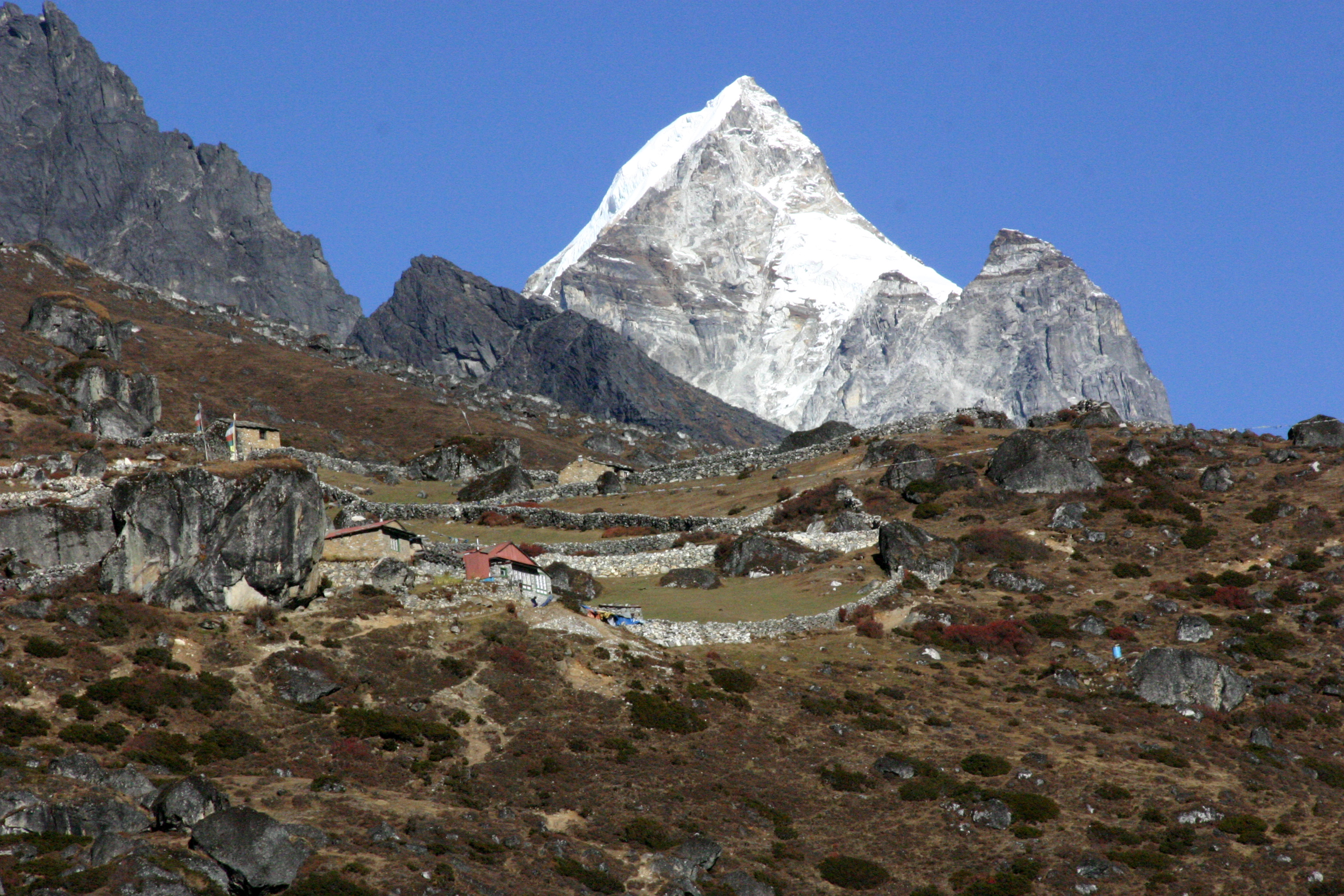
Southeast aspect

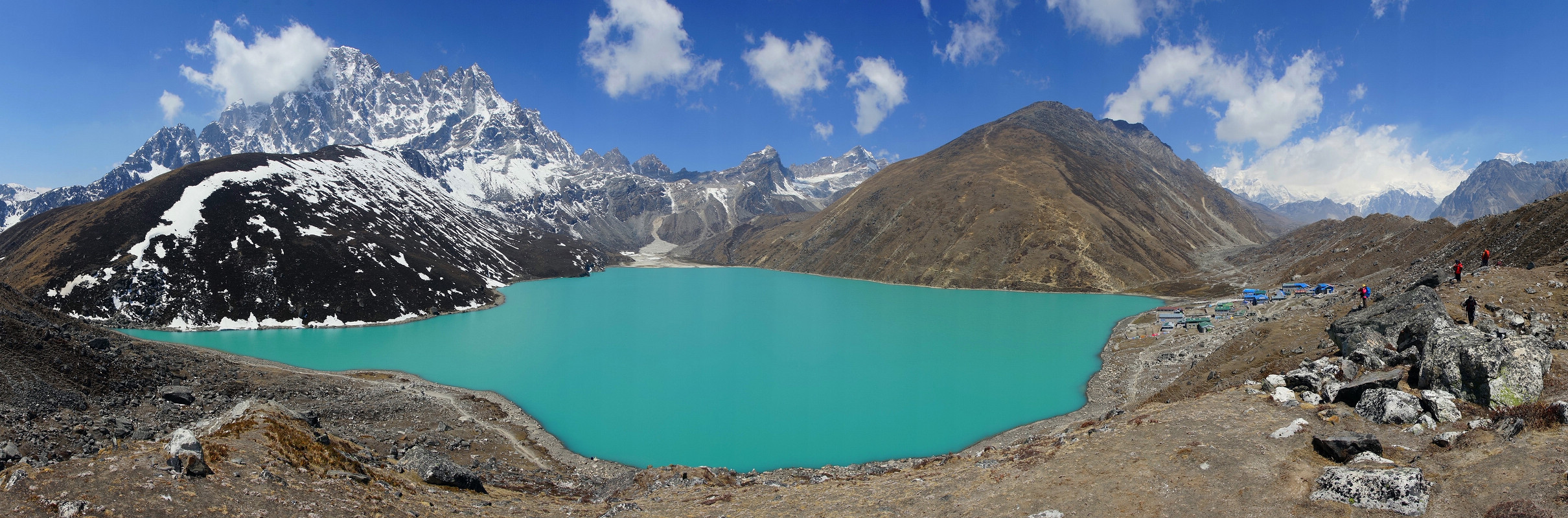
Phari Lapcha (left), Gokyo Ri (right)

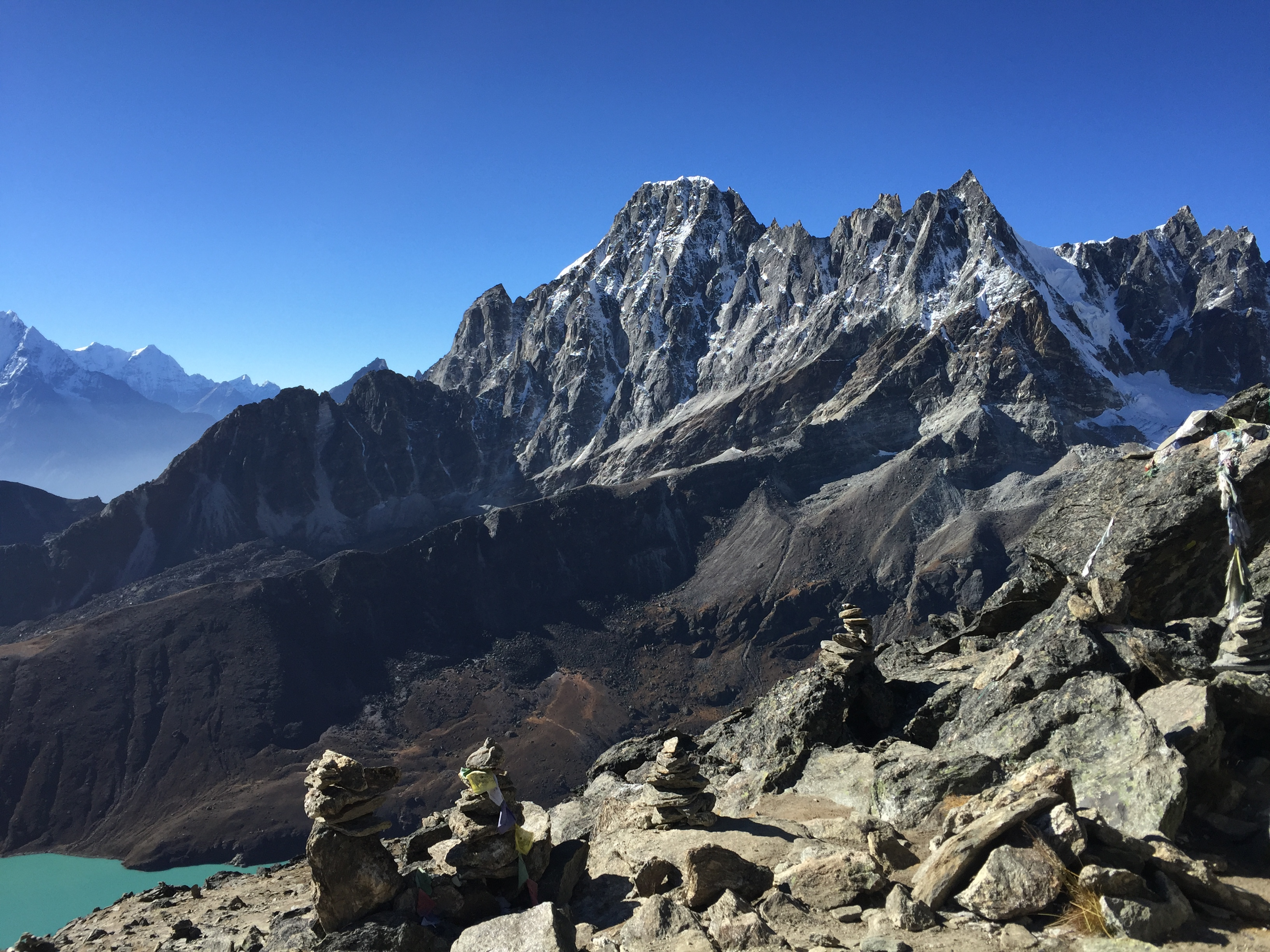
Phari Lapcha from Gokyo Ri

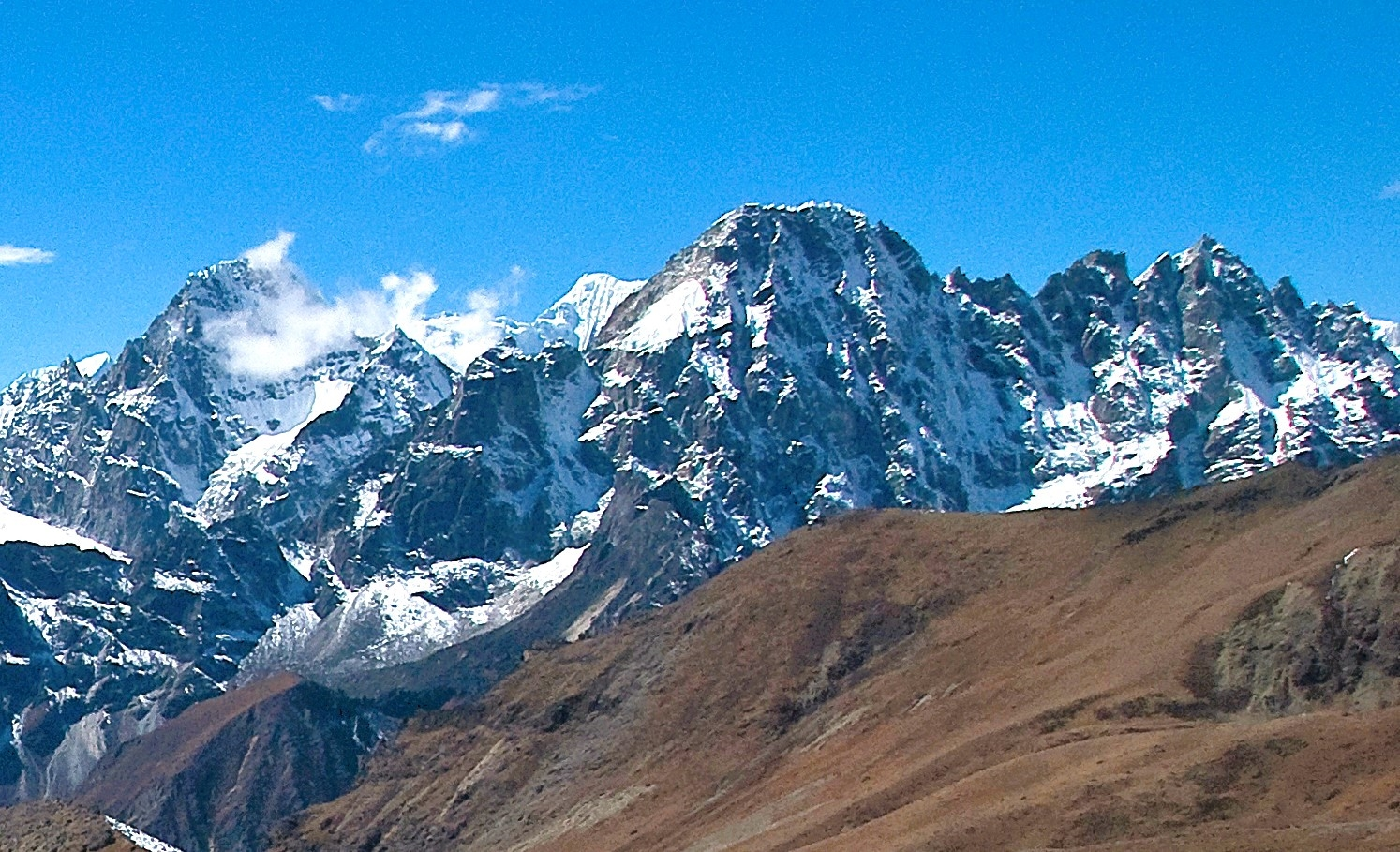
Northeast aspect from Cho La Pass
(Kyazo Ri to left)

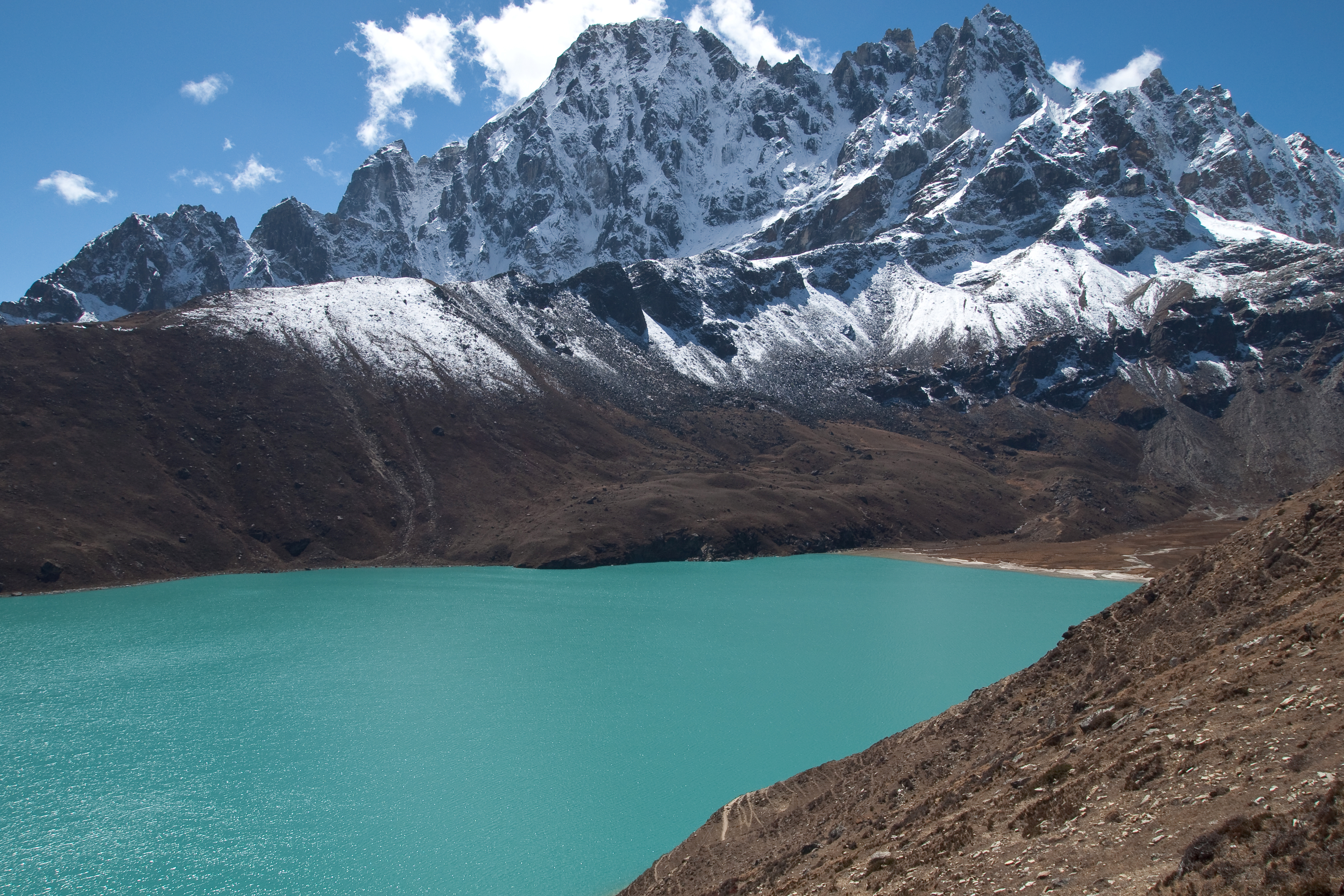

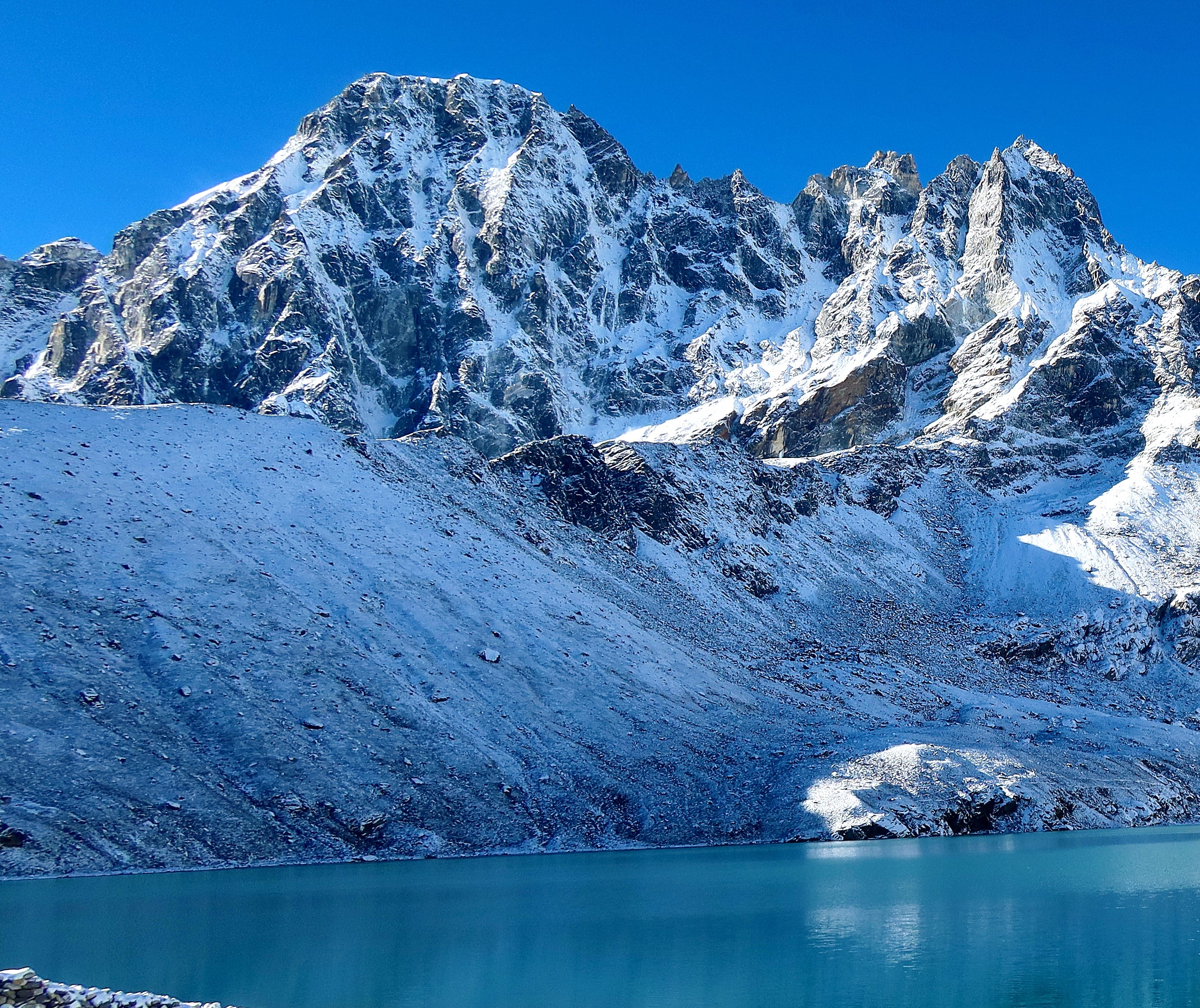

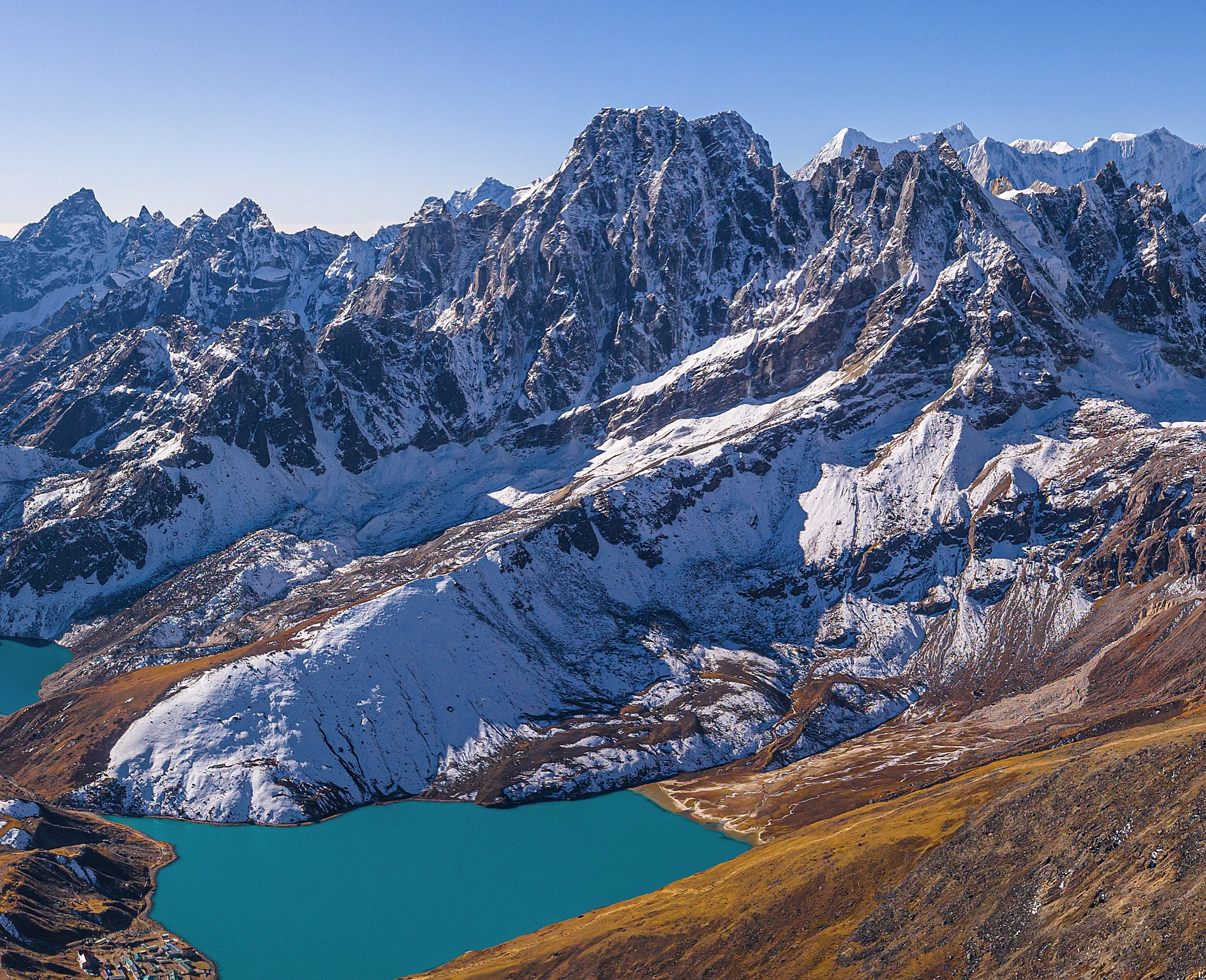
Aerial view of North aspect

== See also ==
- Geology of the Himalayas
