= DOL =

DOL may refer to:

- David O'Leary (born 1958), Irish football manager and former player
- Deauville – Saint-Gatien Airport (IATA code)
- Degree of Operating Leverage, a measure of operating leverage – how revenue growth translates into growth in operating income
- Department of Labor
- Direct on line starter, starter starts electric motors by applying the full line voltage to the motor terminals
- Duke of Lancaster's Regiment, one of the new large infantry regiments of the British Army
- Division of labour
- Daily oral language, in language arts classes in schools
- Dream Out Loud, an Indian rock band
- 1,3-dioxolane, a chemical component with chemical formula (CH_{2})_{2}O_{2}CH_{2}

== See also ==
- Dol (disambiguation)
- Dolnet.gr, company publication website of Lambrakis Press Group, a media group in Greece
