= Dule =

Dule may refer to:

- Dule tree
- Dule people, or Guna people, an indigenous people of Panama and Colombia
- Dule, Ribnica, a village in the Municipality of Ribnica, southern Slovenia
- Dule, Škocjan, a village in the Municipality of Škocjan, southeastern Slovenia
- Dule Temple, in China

== People with the name ==
- Dušan Dimitrijević, known as "Dule", Serbian chetnik
- Dulé Hill, American actor and tap dancer
- Parid Dule, Albanian painter and martial artist
- Vangjel Dule, Greek politician

== See also ==
- Dhule, a city in India
