= Machhermo =

Coordinates: 27°50′N 86°42′E

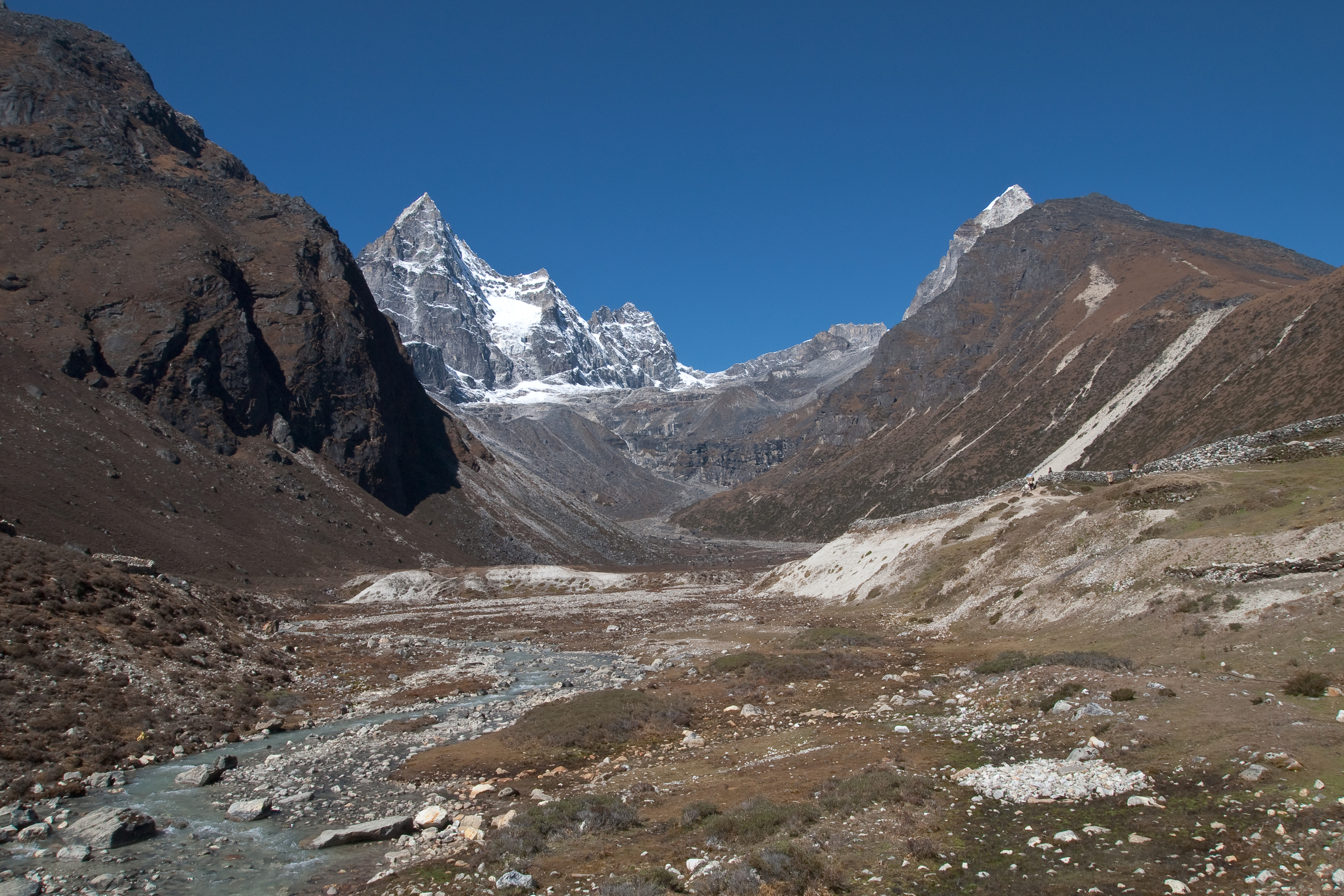
Machermo River, Machermo Glacier, and Kyazo Ri

Machermo is a small village in the Khumbu region of eastern Nepal. It lies in the Dudh Kosi River valley just north of Dole and south of Gokyo at an altitude of 4470m, just below the terminal moraine of the Ngozumpa glacier, the longest glacier in the Himalayas.

Machhermo is often a stopping point for trekkers on their way to Sagarmartha (Mount Everest) via the Gokyo Ri route. Its primary function is to support the tourism industry and as such consists of a number of guesthouses.

Machhermo

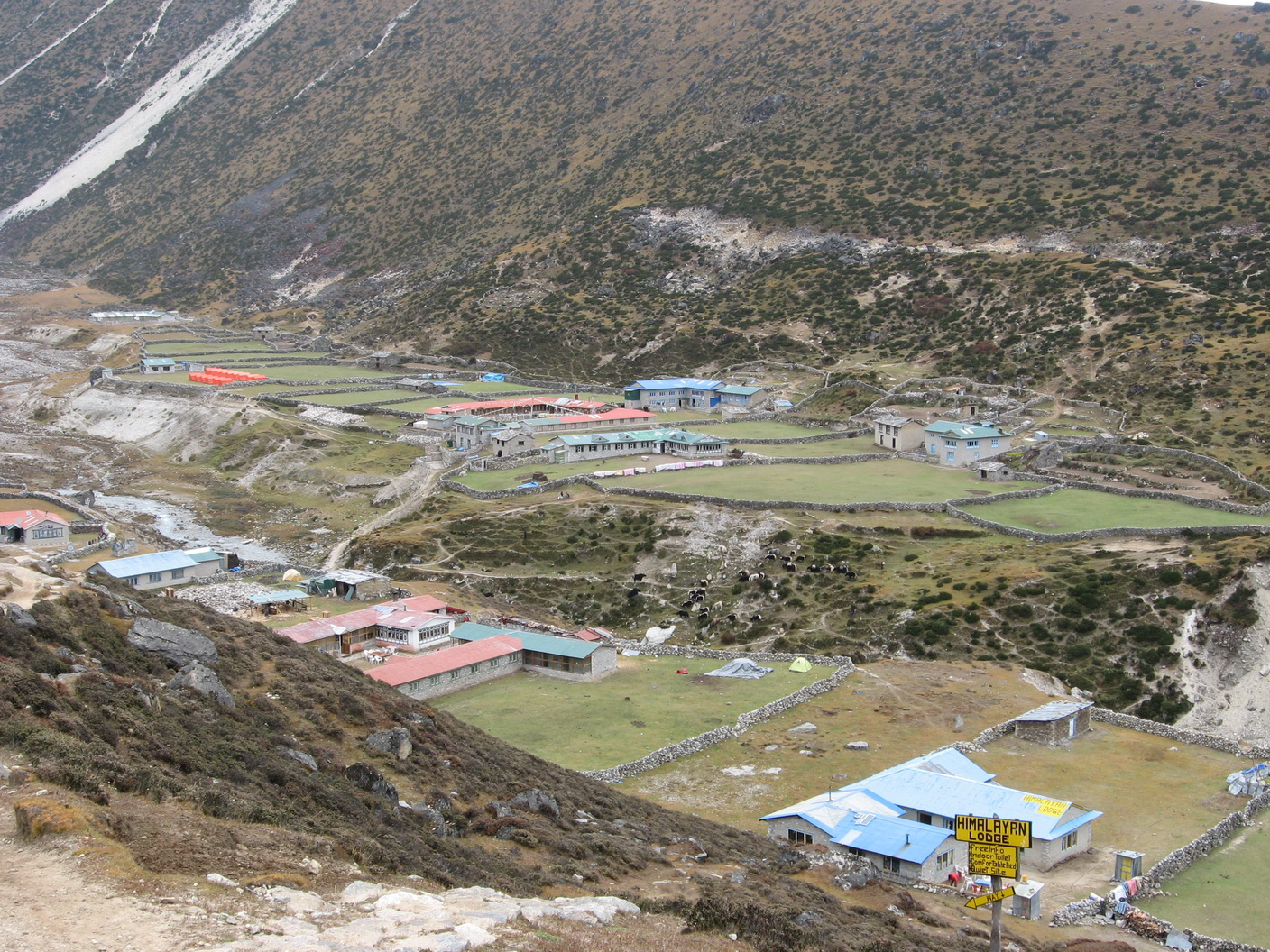

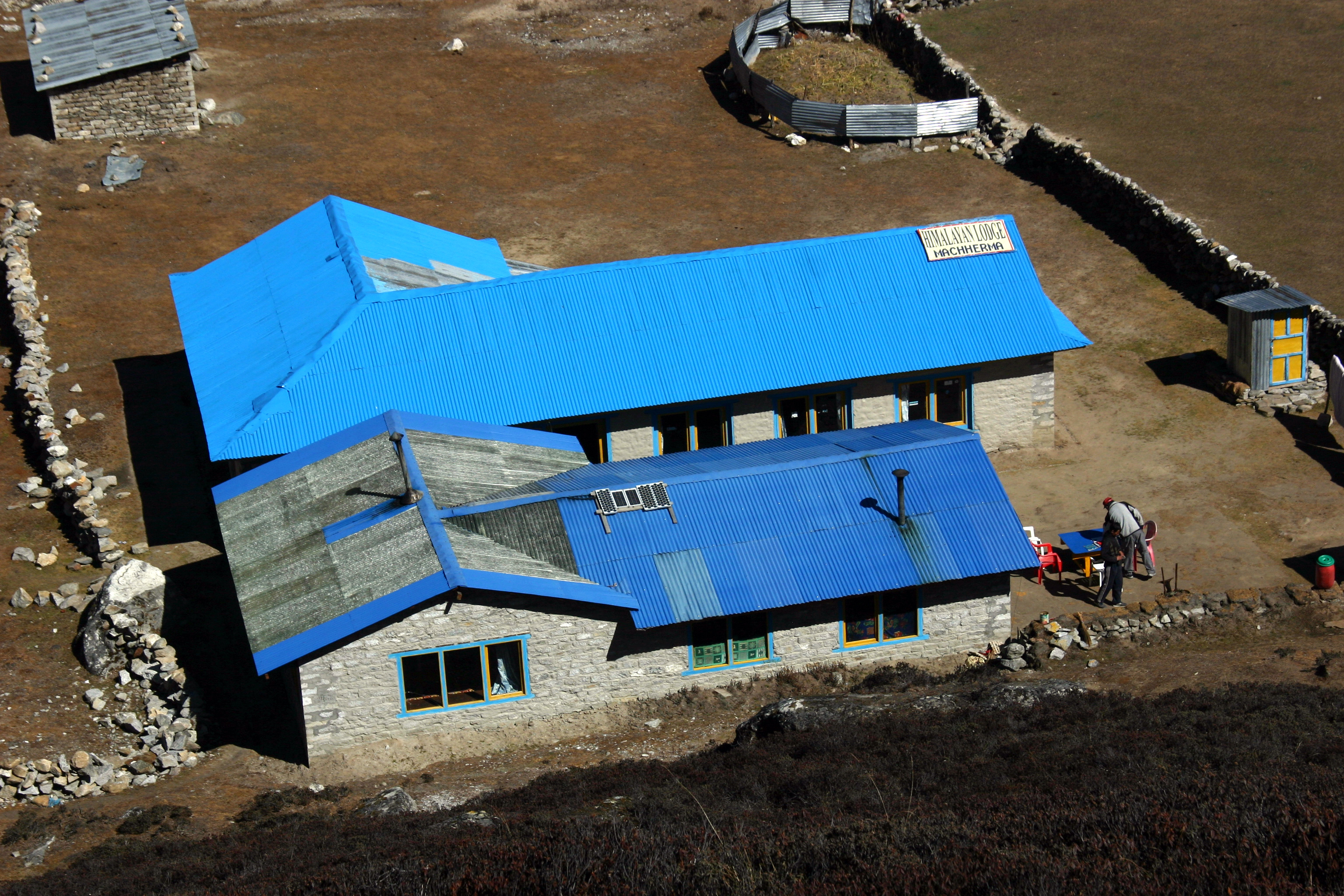

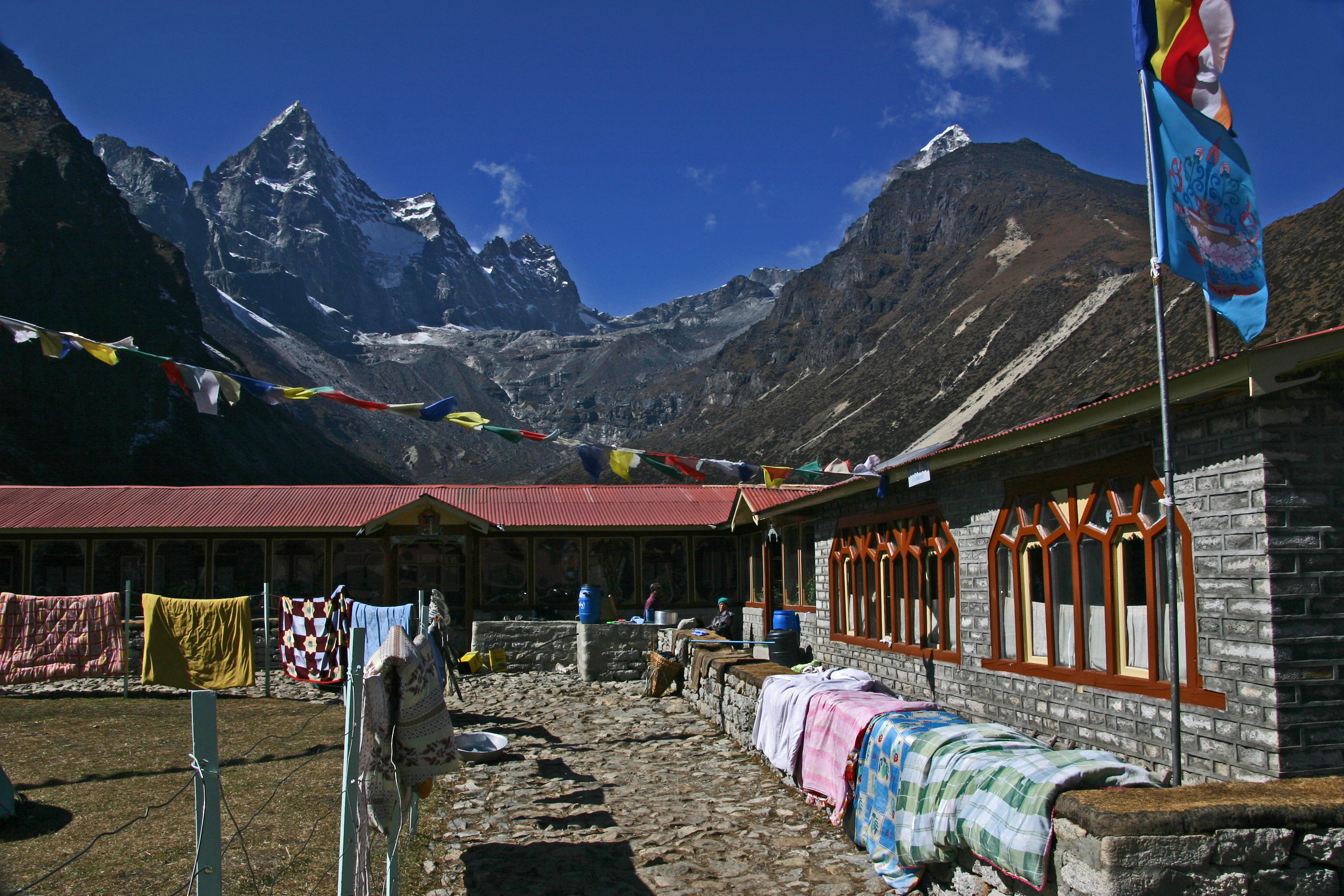

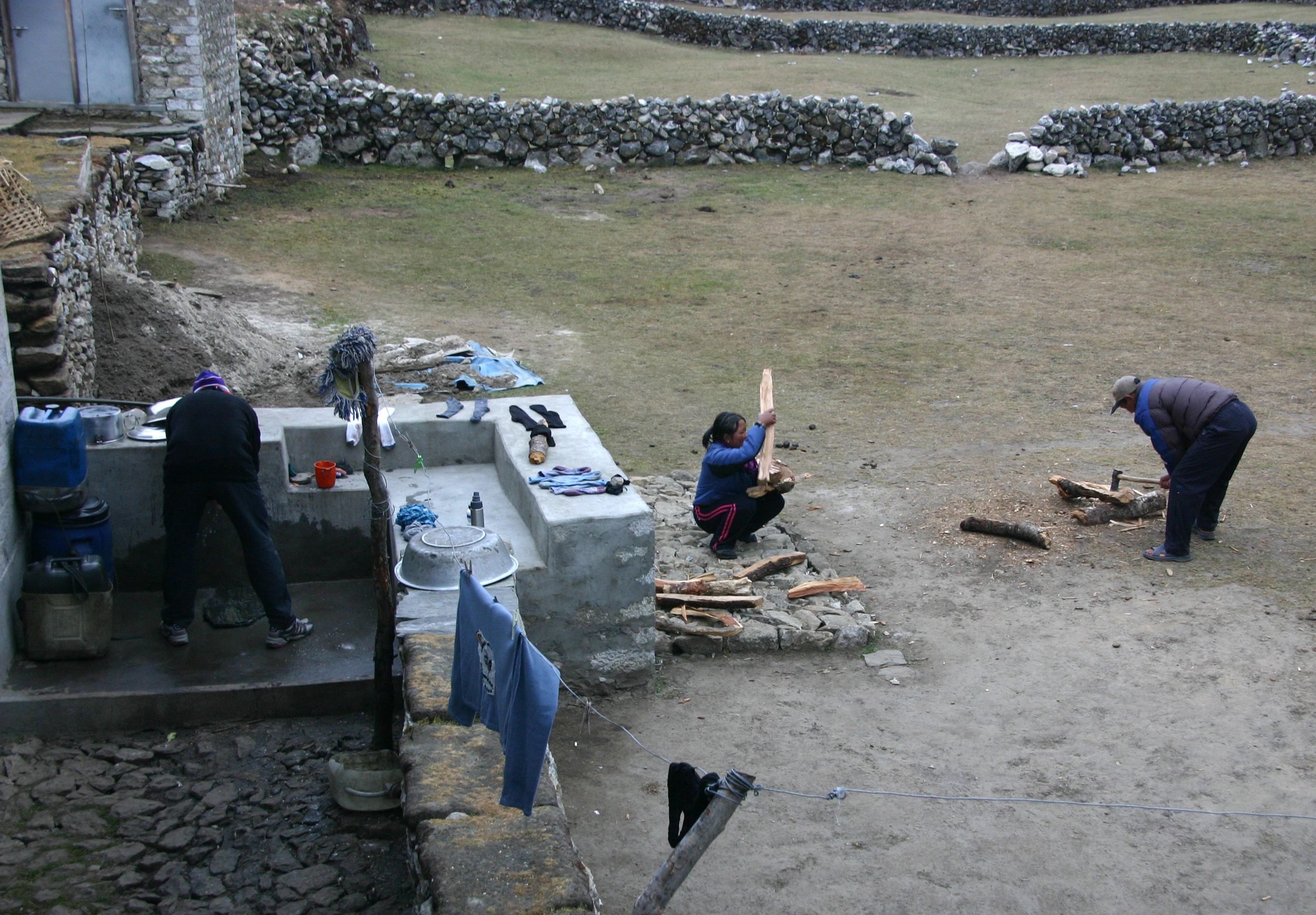

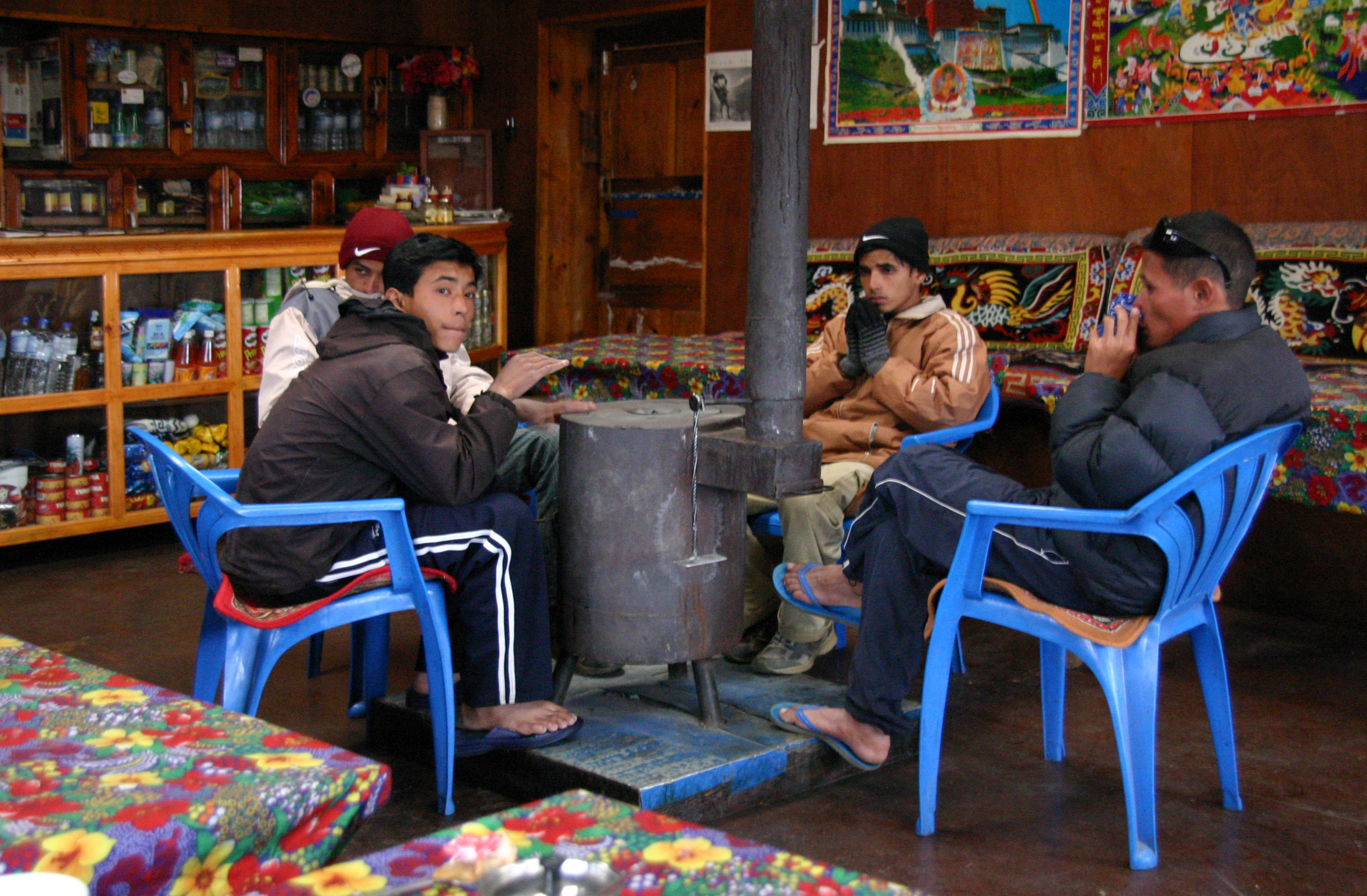

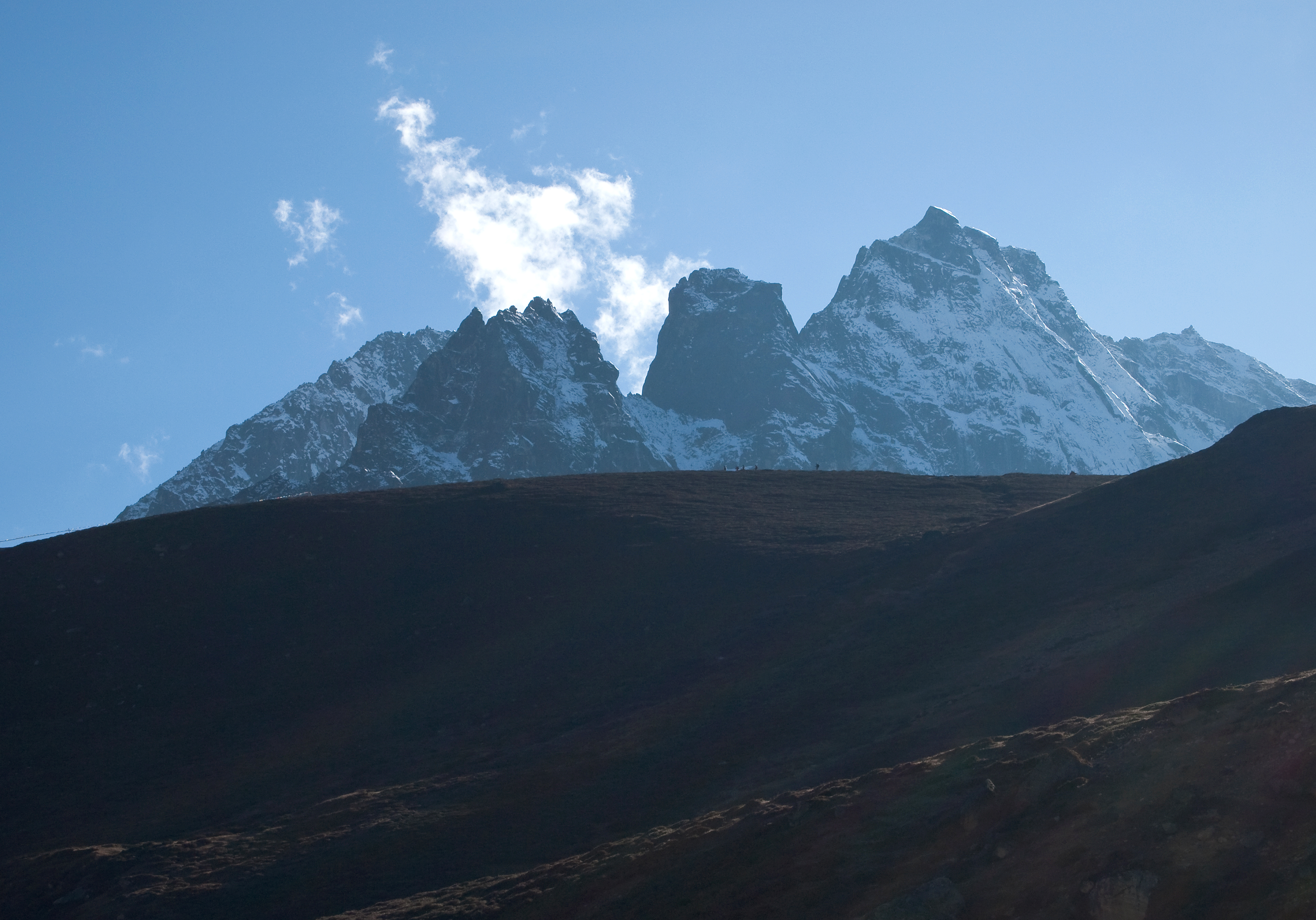

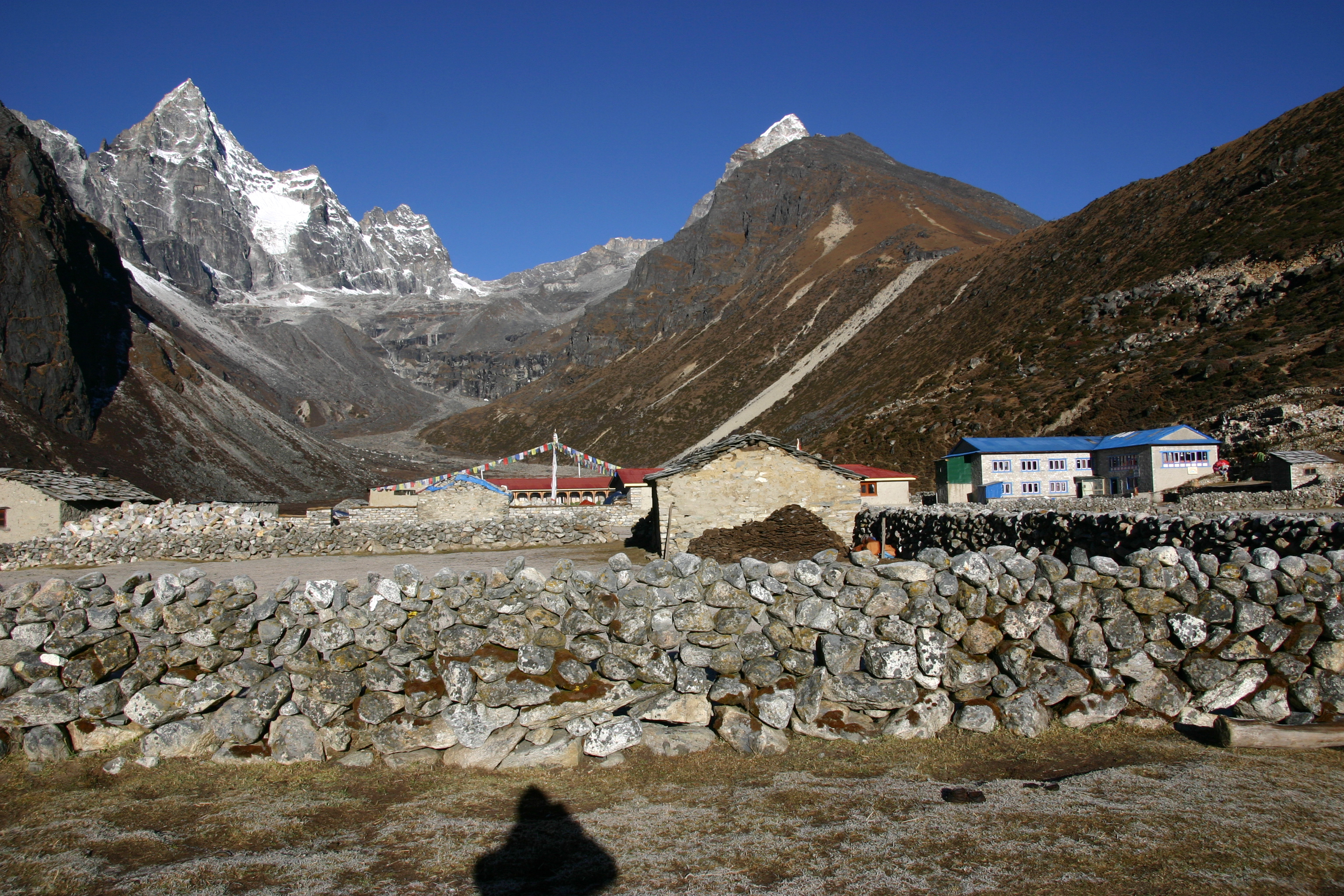

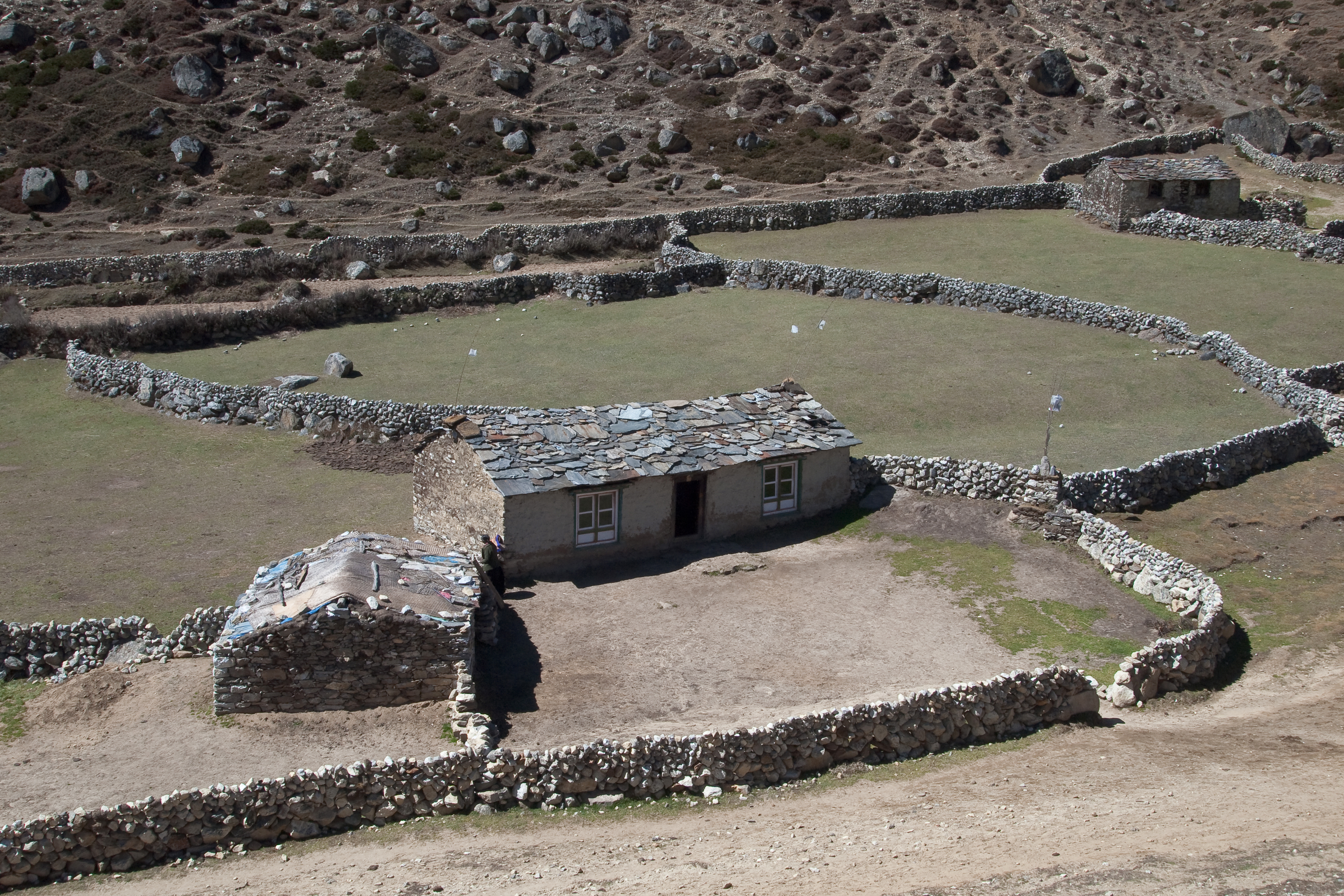

== See also ==
- Gokyo Lakes
