= Dole, Nepal =

Coordinates: 27°50′N 86°43′E

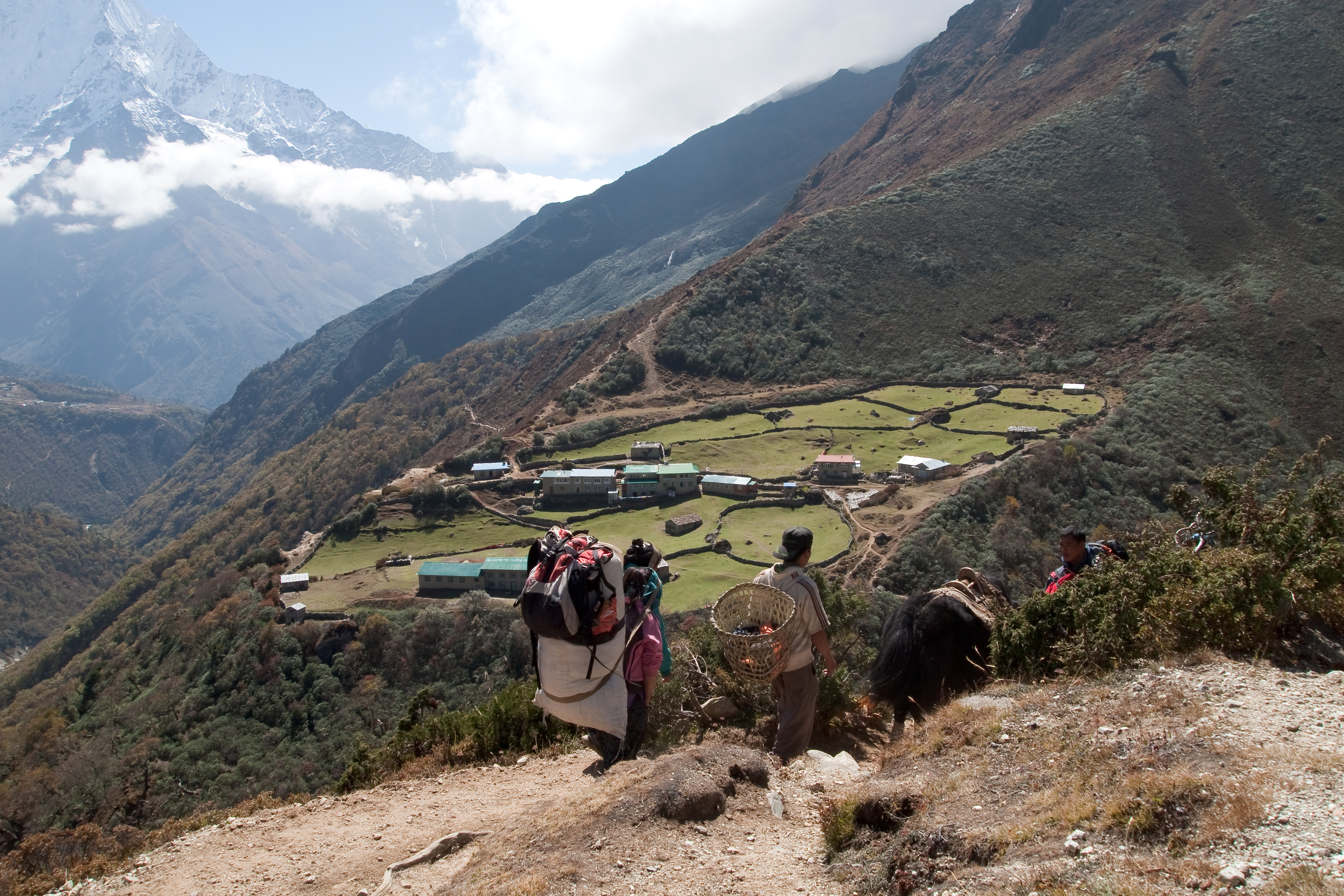
Dole

Dole is a small village in the Khumbu region of Nepal. It lies in the Dudh Kosi River valley just north of Khumjung and south of Machhermo at an altitude of 4038m (it is incorrectly listed as 4200m on many trekking maps).

Dole is often a stopping point for trekkers on their way to Gokyo or Sagarmartha (Mount Everest) via the Cho La route. Its primary function is to support the tourism industry and as such consists of a number of guesthouses.

Dole

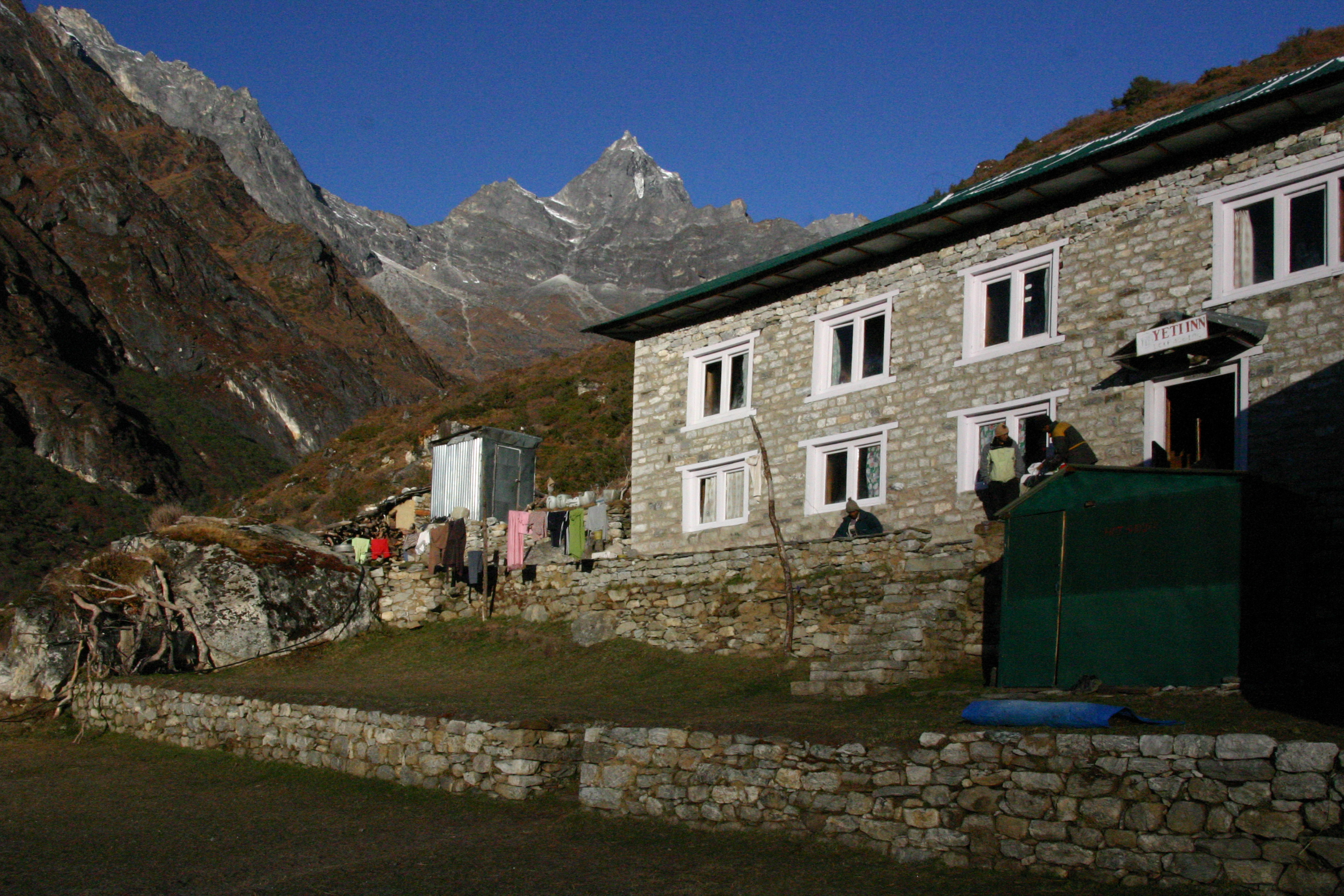

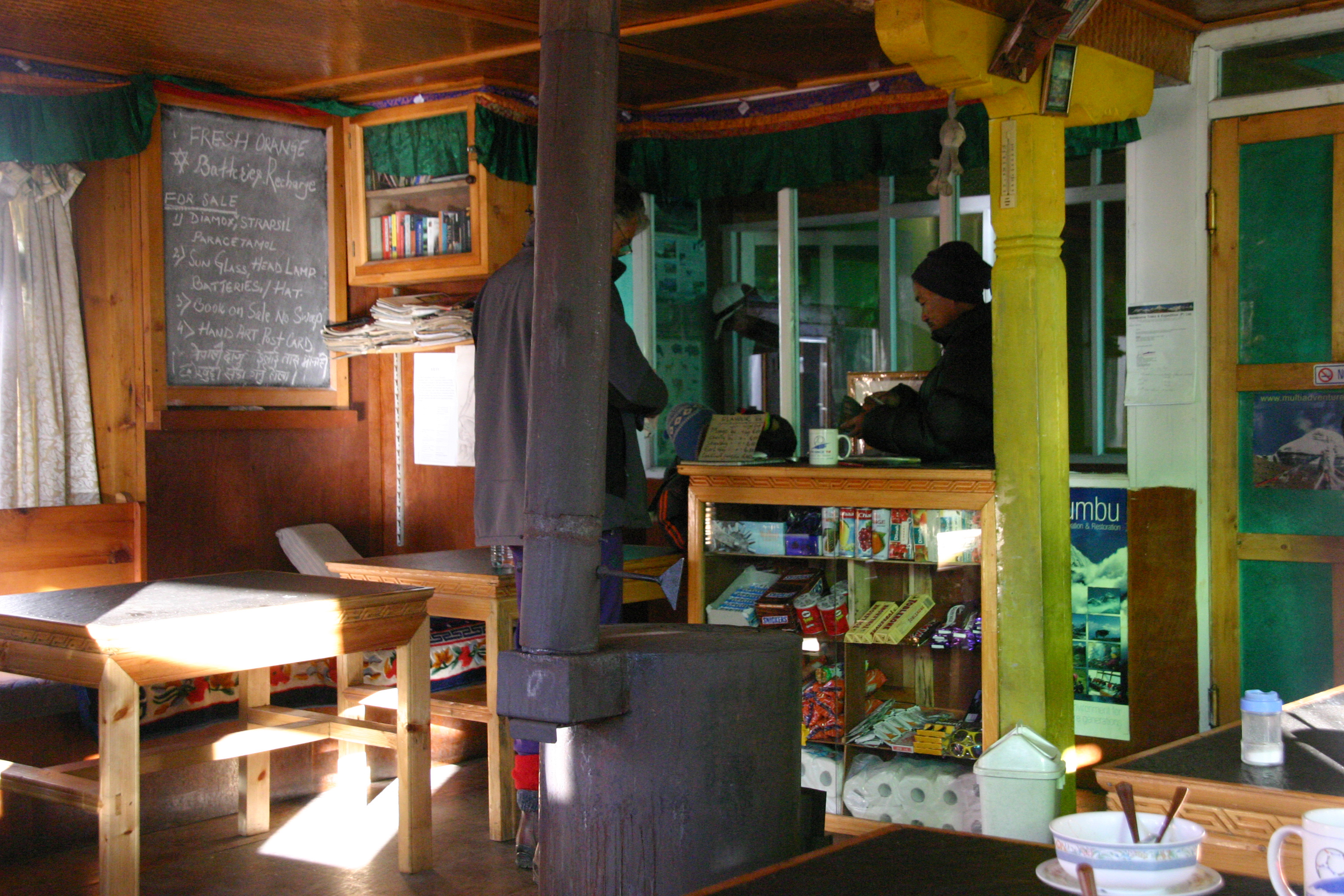

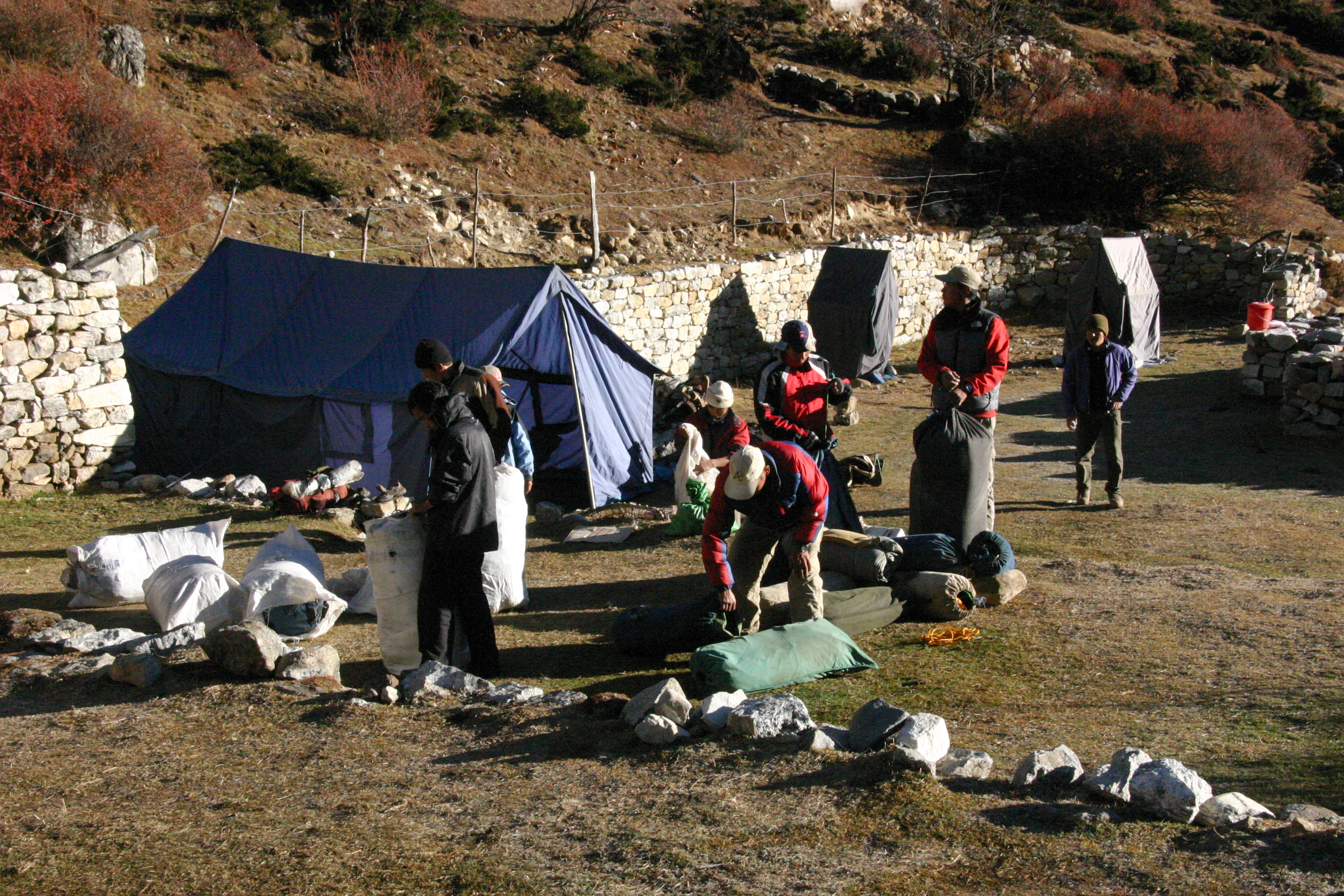

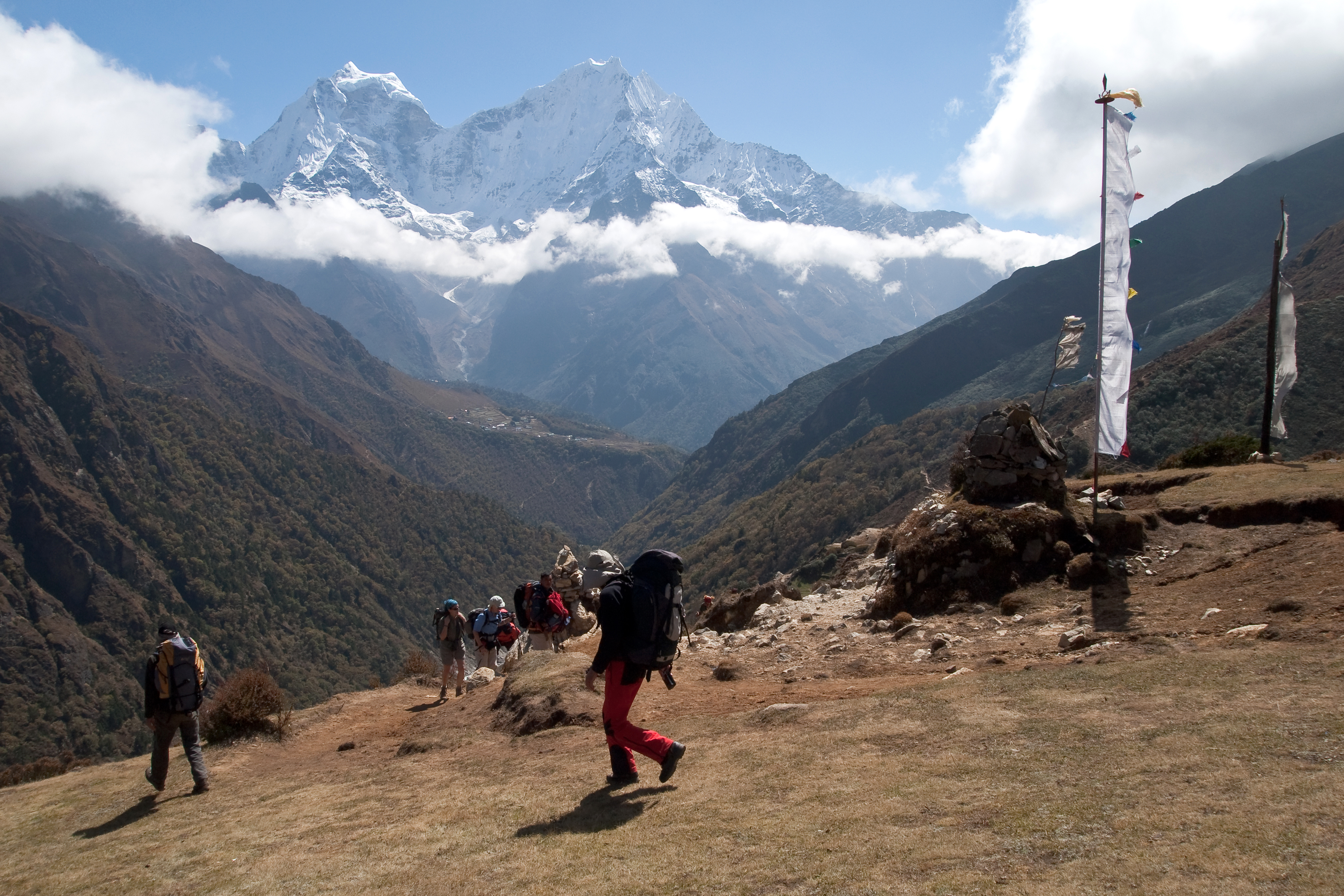
