= Dole (surname) =

Dole is a surname. Notable people with the surname include:

- Augustus O. Dole (1813–1876), U.S. politician
- Bob Dole (1923–2021), U.S. politician, former U.S. Senator
- Charles Fletcher Dole (1845–1927), Unitarian minister and author
- Daniel Dole (1808–1878), missionary who founded Punahou School
- Edmund Pearson Dole (1850–1928), lawyer and Hawaii attorney general
- Elizabeth Dole, (born 1936), U.S. politician, former U.S. Senator and former U.S. Cabinet member, wife of "Bob" Dole
- George Dole (wrestler) (1885–1928), American sport wrestler
- James Dole (1877–1958), Hawaiian Pineapple planter
- Lester Dole (1855–1918), American baseball player
- Nathan Haskell Dole (1852–1935), Boston author
- Mary Phylinda Dole (1862–1947), American woman doctor
- Sanford B. Dole (1844–1926), first Governor of Hawaii
- Vincent Dole (1913–2006), American doctor
- Wigglesworth Dole (1779–1845), Deacon and patriarch of several others
