= Kyazo Ri =

Mountain in Khumbu, Nepal

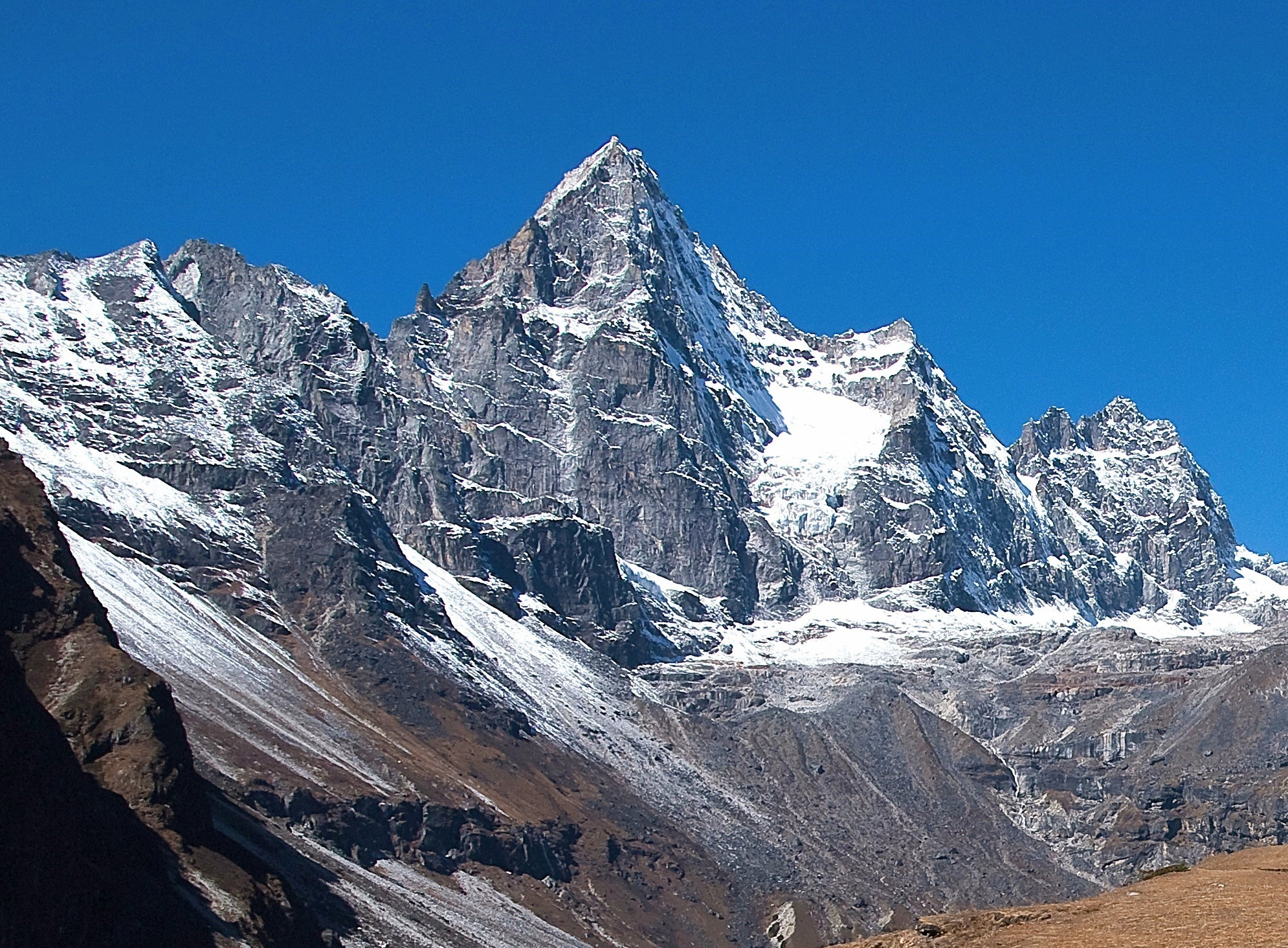
- East aspect

Highest point
- Elevation: 6,151 m (20,180 ft)
- Prominence: 831 m (2,726 ft)
- Isolation: 9.16 km (5.69 mi)
- Coordinates: 27°54′33″N 86°40′14″E

Geography
- Location within Nepal
- Interactive map of Kyazo Ri
- Location: Khumbu
- Country: Nepal
- Province: Koshi
- District: Solukhumbu
- Protected area: Sagarmatha National Park
- Parent range: Himalaya; Mahalangur Himal

Climbing
- First ascent: 2002

Kyazo Ri, also spelled Kyajo Ri, is a mountain in Nepal.

== Description ==
Kyazo Ri is a 6,151-metre (20,180-foot) summit in the Khumbu region of the Nepalese Himalaya. It is situated 25 kilometres (16 mi) west of Mount Everest and 14 kilometres (8.7 mi) north of Namche Bazaar in Sagarmatha National Park. Precipitation runoff from the mountain's slopes drains west into the Bhotekoshi River and east into the Dudh Koshi. Topographic relief is significant as the summit rises over 1,900 metres (6,233 ft) above the Bhotekoshi River in 3.5 kilometres (2.2 mi). Trekkers view the peak when passing by Machhermo en route to Everest Base Camp. This peak was placed on the list of permitted trekking peaks in 2002. The first authorized ascent of the summit was made on October 20, 2002, by Duncan Wilson and Vincent Marche.

== Climate ==
Based on the Köppen climate classification, Kyazo Ri is located in a tundra climate zone with cold, snowy winters, and cool summers. Weather systems coming off the Bay of Bengal are forced upwards by the Himalaya mountains (orographic lift), causing heavy precipitation in the form of rainfall and snowfall. Mid-June through early-August is the monsoon season. The months of April, May, September, and October offer the most favorable weather for viewing or climbing this peak.

== Gallery ==
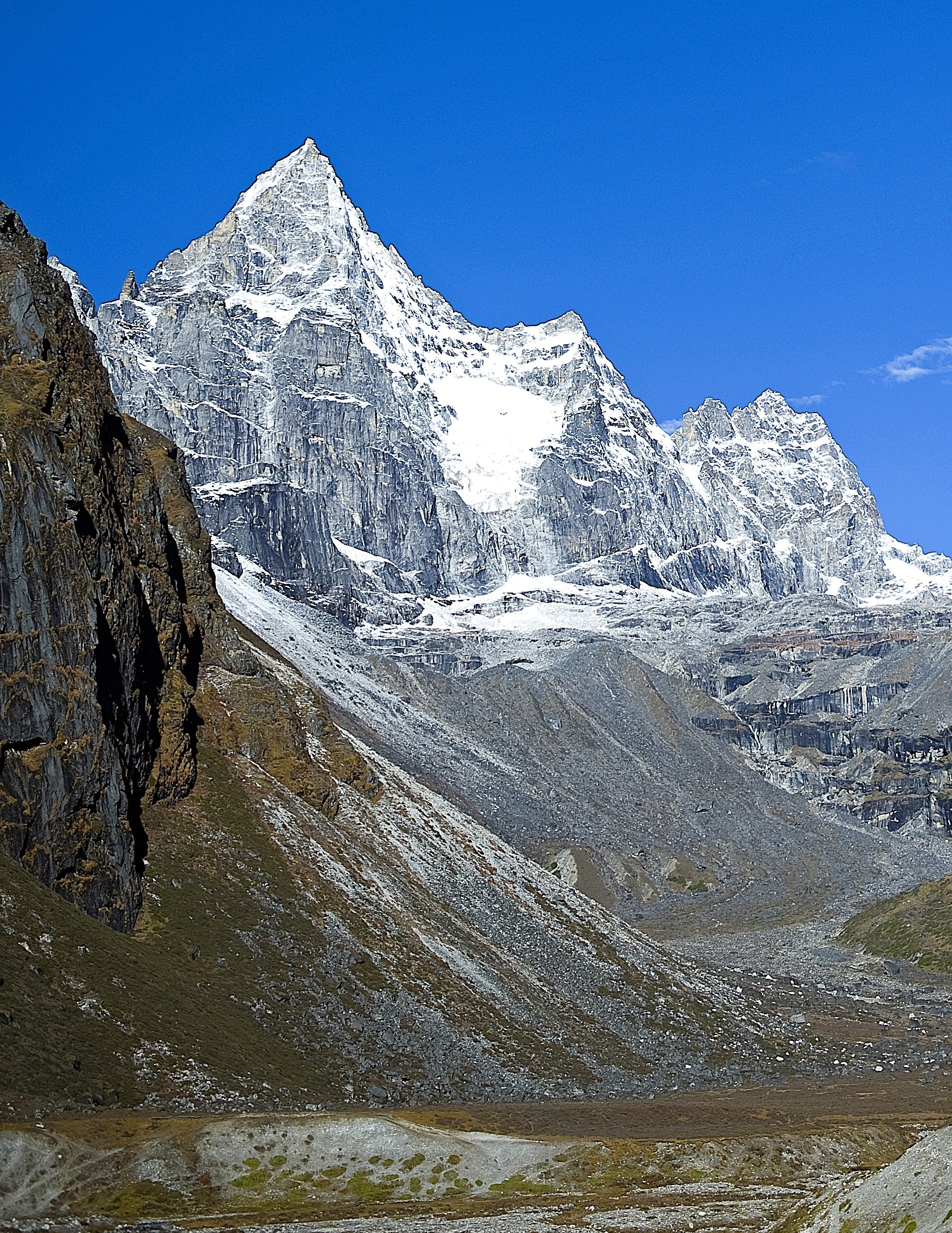
East aspect

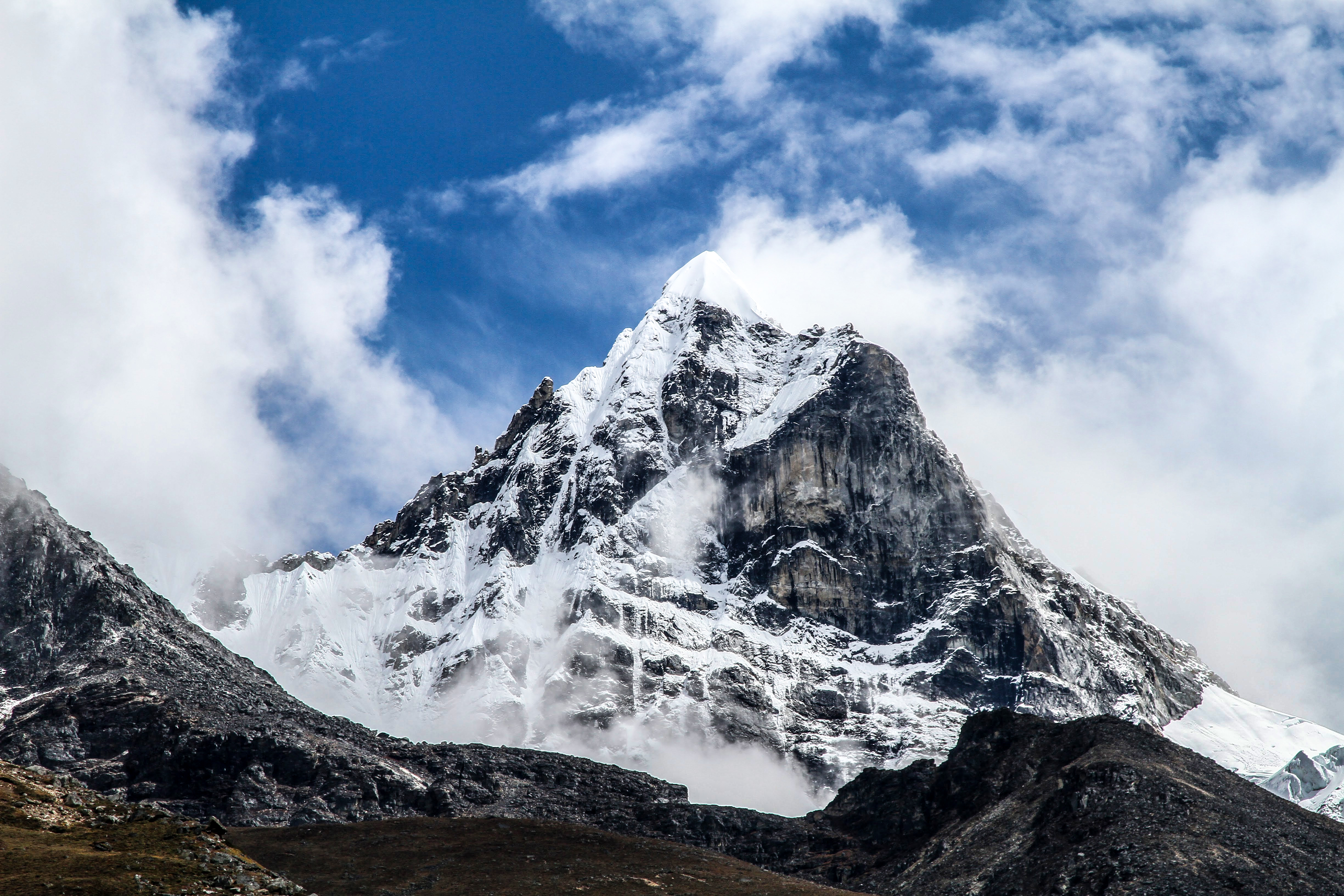

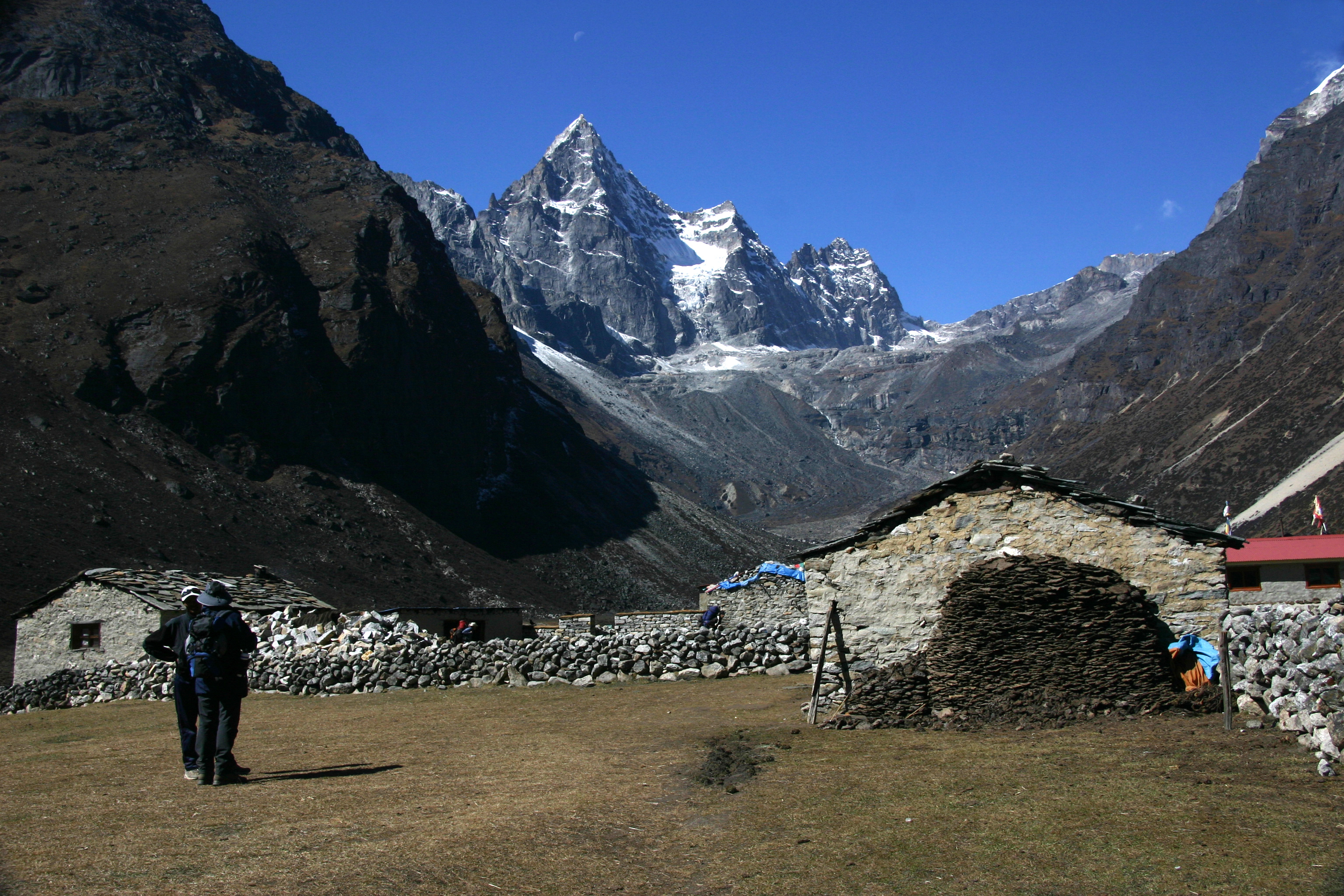

== See also ==
- Geology of the Himalayas
