= Hungchi =

Mountain in Nepal

- Hunchhi
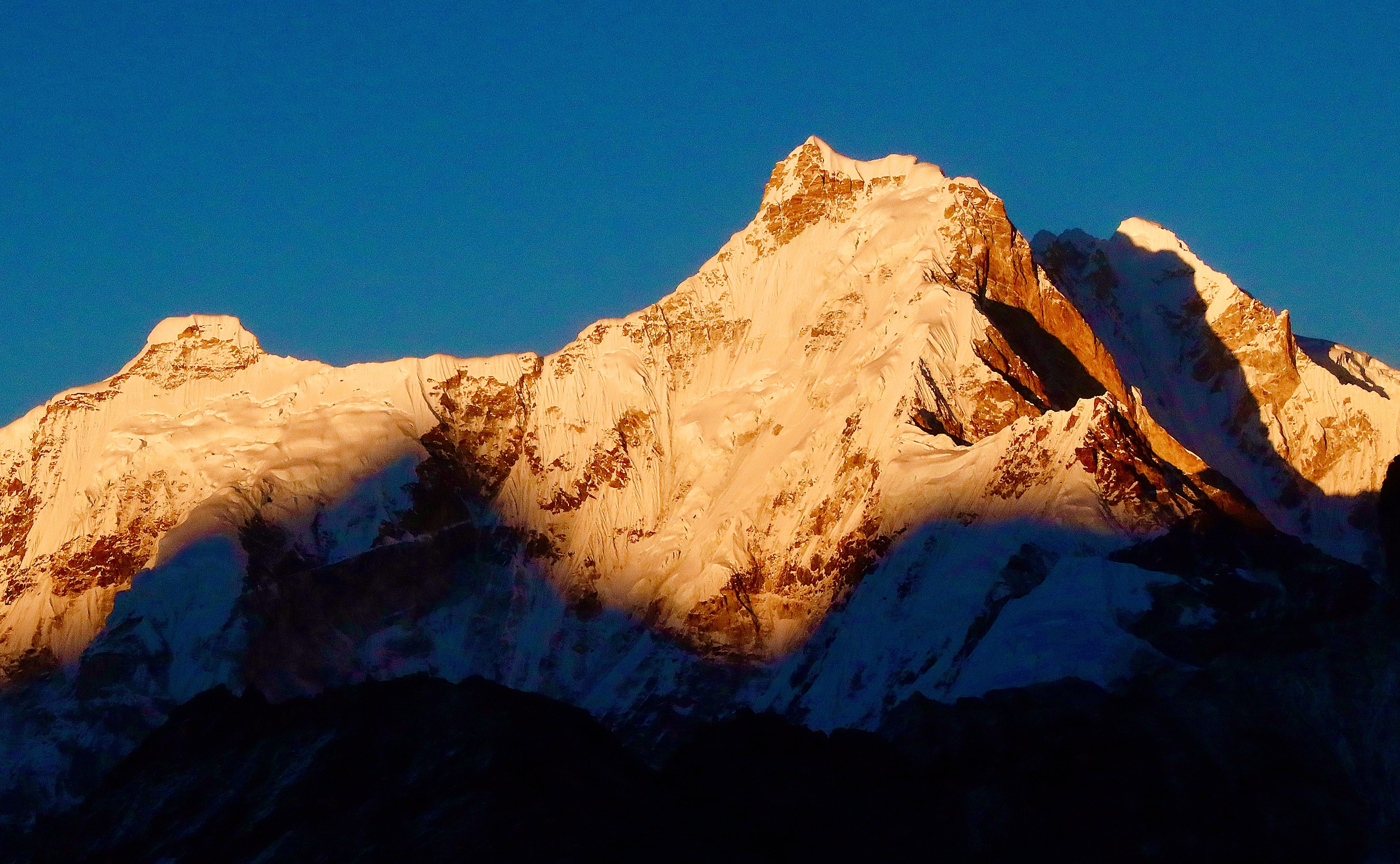
- Southwest aspect at sunset

Highest point
- Elevation: 7,029 m (23,061 ft)
- Prominence: 869 m (2,851 ft)
- Isolation: 5.43 km (3.37 mi)
- Coordinates: 28°02′06″N 86°45′32″E

Geography
- Location within Nepal Location within Tibet Location within China Location within Asia
- Location: China–Nepal border
- Countries: Nepal and China
- Province: Koshi
- District: Solukhumbu
- Protected area: Sagarmatha National Park
- Parent range: Himalayas

Climbing
- First ascent: 2003

Hungchi (also known as Chakhung) is a mountain peak in the Himalayas on the border of Nepal and the Tibet Autonomous Region of People's Republic of China.

== Location ==
Hungchi is located at 7,029 m (23,061 ft), at the head of Gyoko valley and south of high mountain pass Nup La. To the east, the ridge continues over to the Chumbu and Pumori. It is situated 17 kilometres (11 mi) west-northwest of Mount Everest on the boundary that Sagarmatha National Park shares with Qomolangma National Nature Preserve. Precipitation runoff from the mountain's slopes drains south to the Dudh Koshi and north to the Rong River in Tibet, both of which are tributaries of the Arun River.

== Climbing history ==
Hungchi was first climbed on April 19, 2003, by a Japanese expedition.

== Climate ==
Based on the Köppen climate classification, Hungchi is located in a tundra climate zone with cold, snowy winters, and cool summers. Weather systems coming off the Bay of Bengal are forced upwards by the Himalaya mountains (orographic lift), causing heavy precipitation in the form of rainfall and snowfall. Mid-June through early-August is the monsoon season. The months of April, May, September, and October offer the most favorable weather for viewing or climbing this peak.

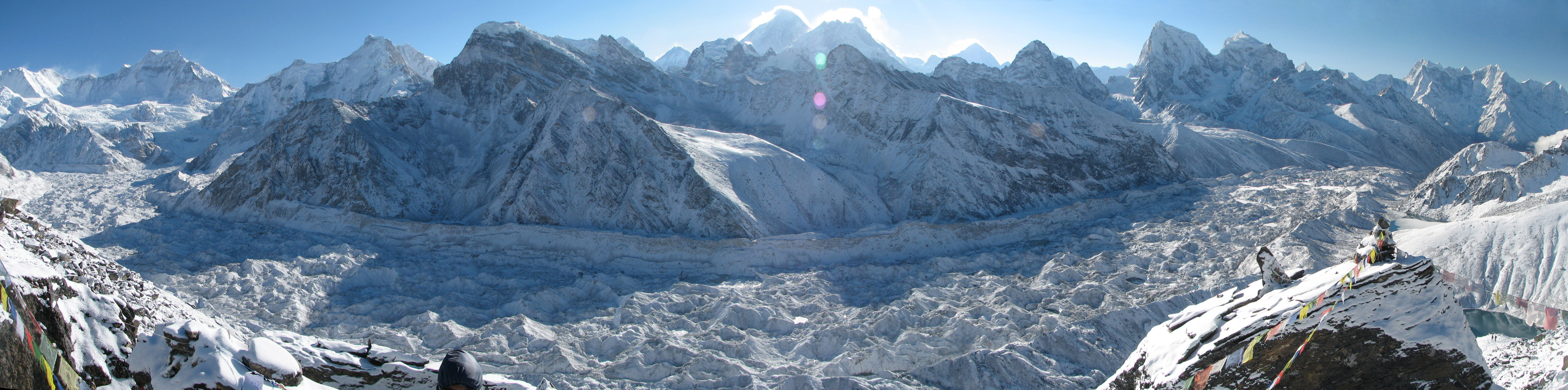
Panoramic view of Ngozumpa glacier and encircling mountains. Hungchi is the second mountain from the left.

== See also ==
- Geology of the Himalayas
