= Gokyo Ri =

Mountain in Nepal

- Gokyo Peak
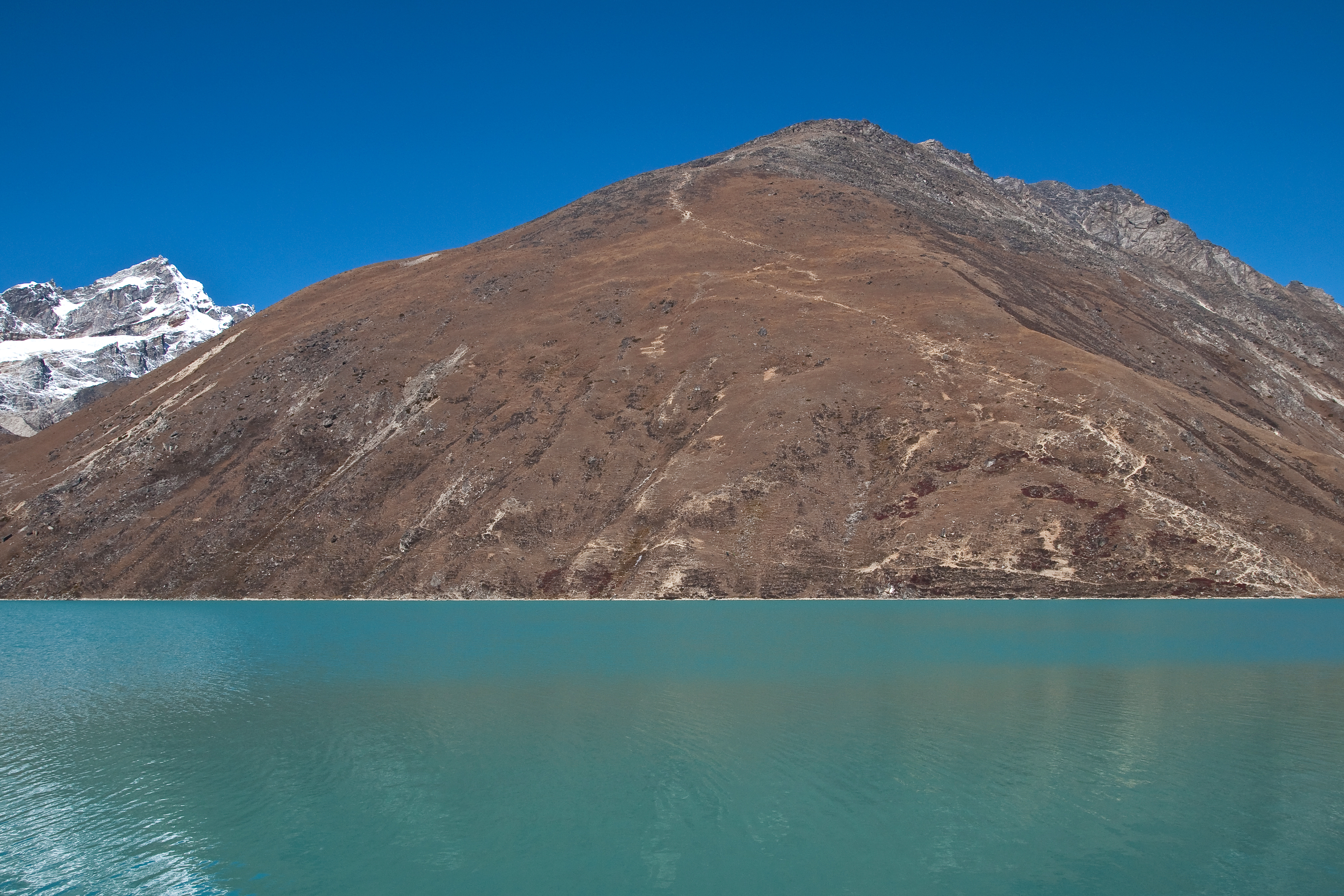
- Gokyo Ri above Gokyo Lake

Highest point
- Elevation: 5,357 m (17,575 ft)
- Listing: List of mountains in Nepal
- Coordinates: 27°57′40″N 86°41′00″E

Geography
- Location within Nepal
- Location: Khumbu, Nepal
- Parent range: Himalayas

Gokyo Peak (Nepali: गोक्यो रि) is a 5,357 m (17,575 ft)-high peak in the Khumbu region of the Nepal Himalayas. It is located on the west side of the Ngozumpa glacier, which is the largest glacier in Nepal and reputed to be the largest in the whole Himalayas. Gokyo (4,750 m, 15,583 ft above sea level), at the base of Gokyo Ri, is a small village with several houses and lodges, and is one of the highest settlements in the world. From the summit of Gokyo Ri it is possible to see four 8,000-metre peaks: Mount Everest, Lhotse, Makalu and Cho Oyu. The Gokyo Lakes are in the area. Other mountains, such as Pumori and Nuptse are also visible from the top, along with five tranquil glacier lakes named together as gokyo lakes. The Gokyo-Ri summit is a 3-hour hike from the nearest village.

Gokyo trek is a fairly popular trekking route. The route itself ends at Gokyo Ri, and trekkers typically turn around at this point and retrace their steps back to the trailhead. There is an alternative mountaineering route that begins near the southern tip of Ngozumpa Glacier and just south of Taujun Lake. This alternative route leads east over the Cho La, a pass at 5,420 m (17,782 ft), where it meets with the main Everest Base Camp trek.

It is usually visited during the circuit trek to Everest Base Camp with the Three Passes Trek. It is slightly off route while visiting Everest base camps (Nepal side) but thousands of backpackers still visit it for the Gokyo Lakes beauty.

There is another higher summit just north of where the main Gokyo trek route ends. It stands at an altitude of 5,483 m (17,989 ft) above sea level.

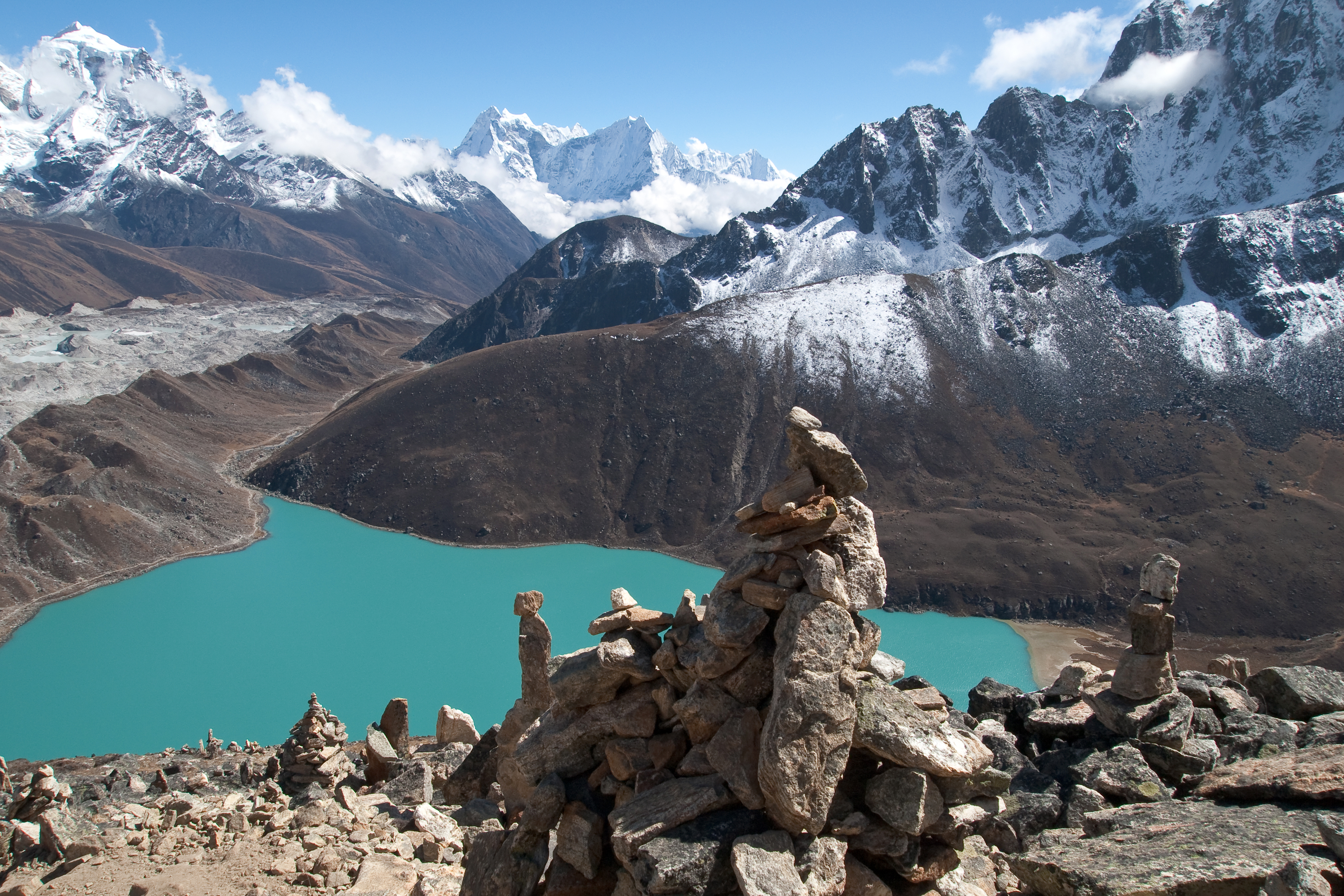
Summit

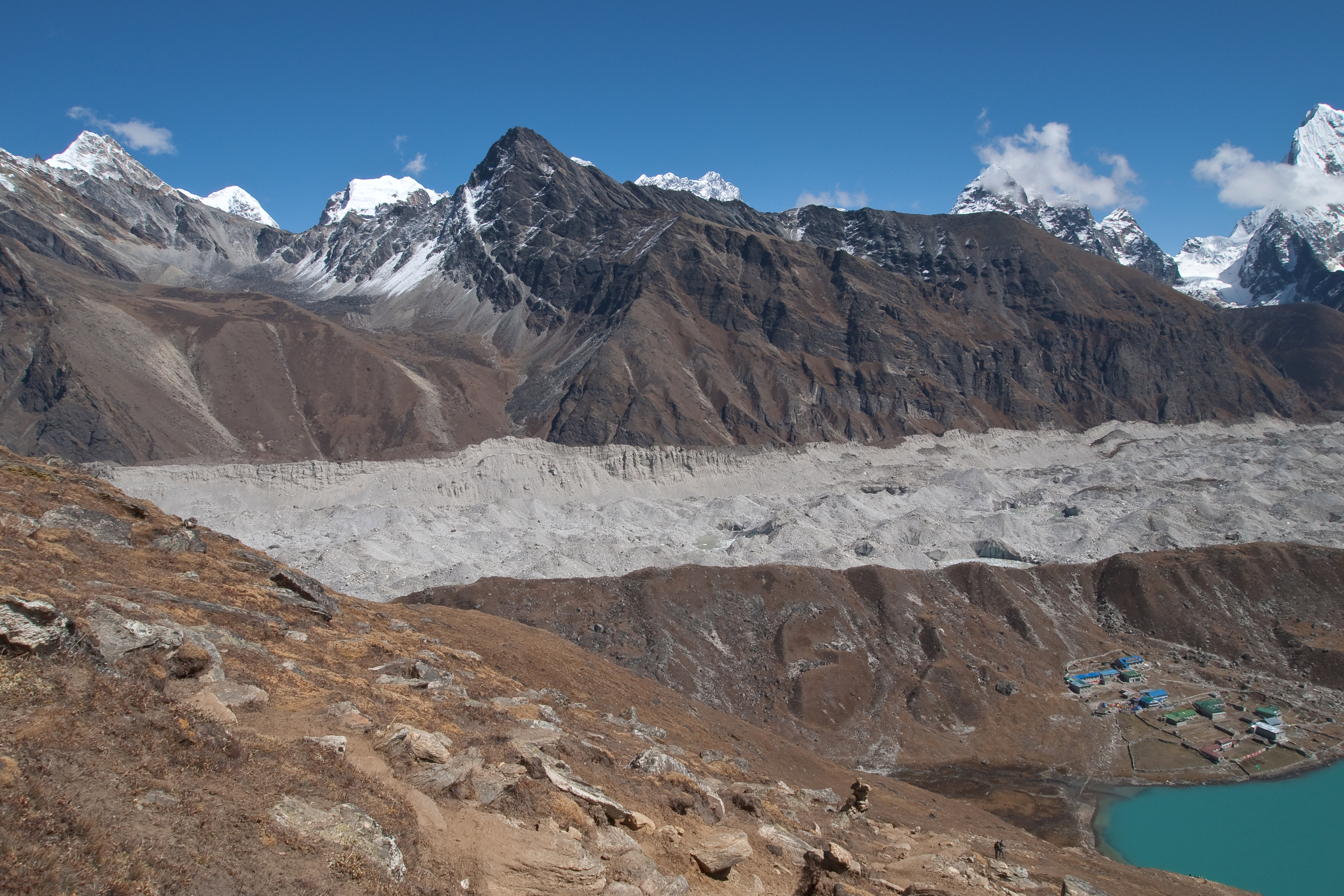
Ngozumpa Glacier from the slopes of Gokyo Ri

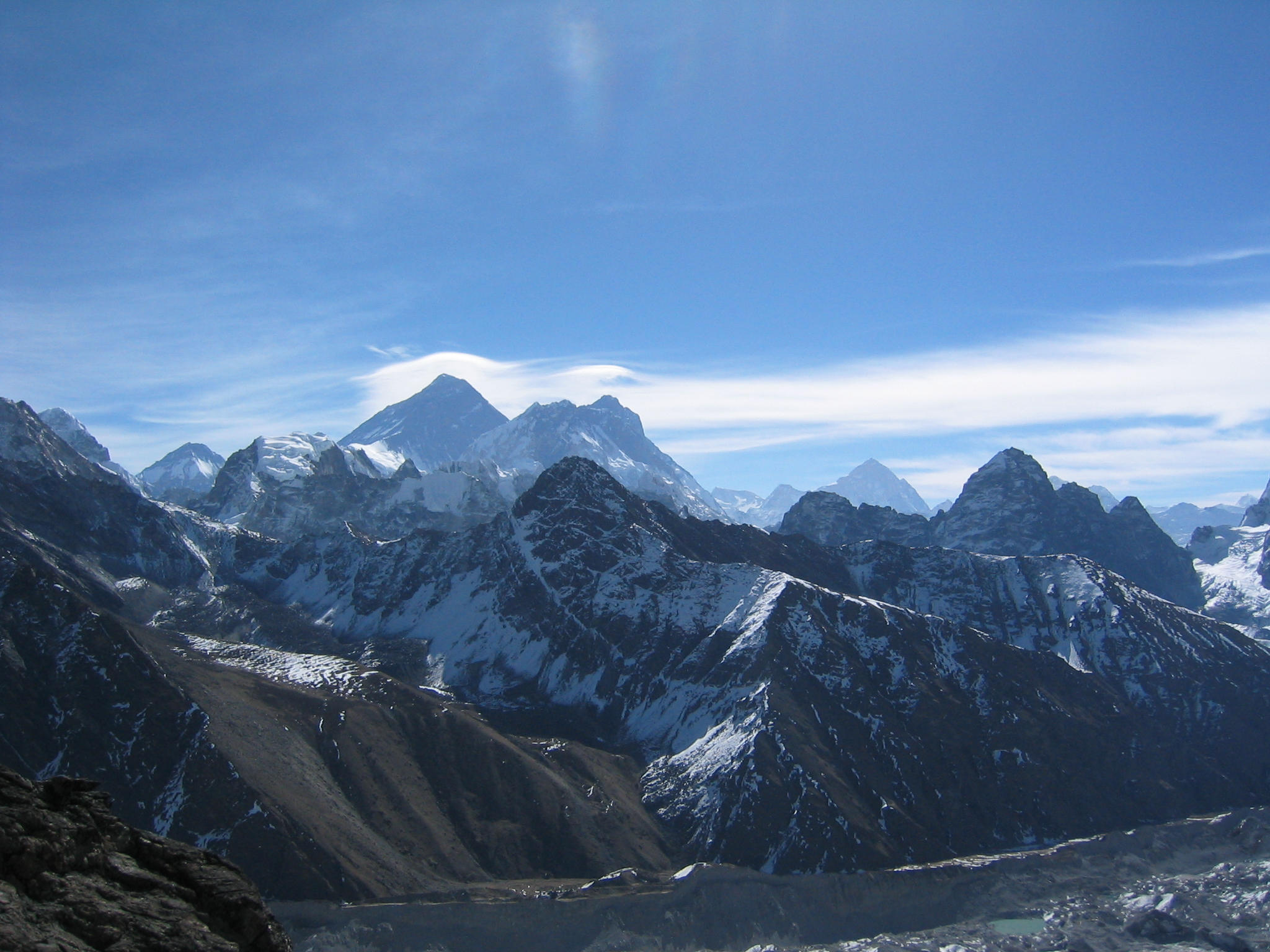
Everest, Lhotse and Makalu from the summit of Gokyo Ri

== Panorama ==
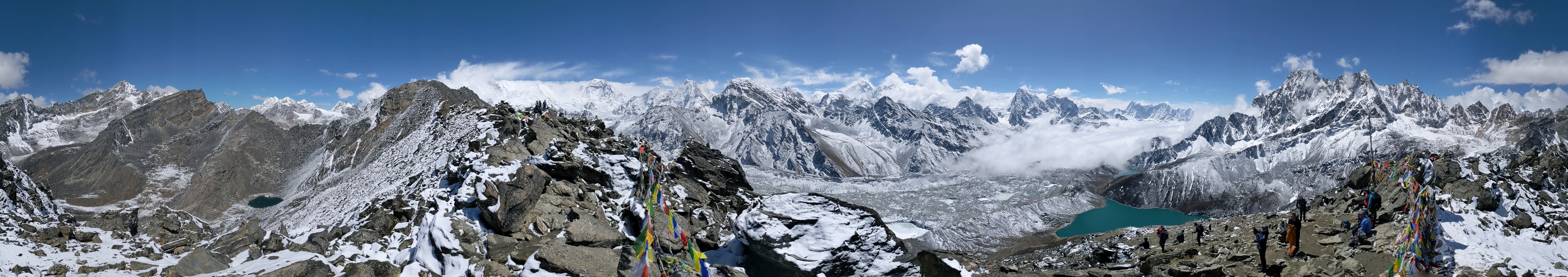
Panorama from the summit of Gokyo Ri, with Gokyo Lake and Mount Everest
