= Supraglacial =

Supraglacial means "of, relating to, or situated or occurring at the surface of a glacier". It may refer to:

- Supraglacial lake
- Supraglacial moraine
- Supraglacial till
