= Cho La (Nepal) =

Mountain pass in Nepal

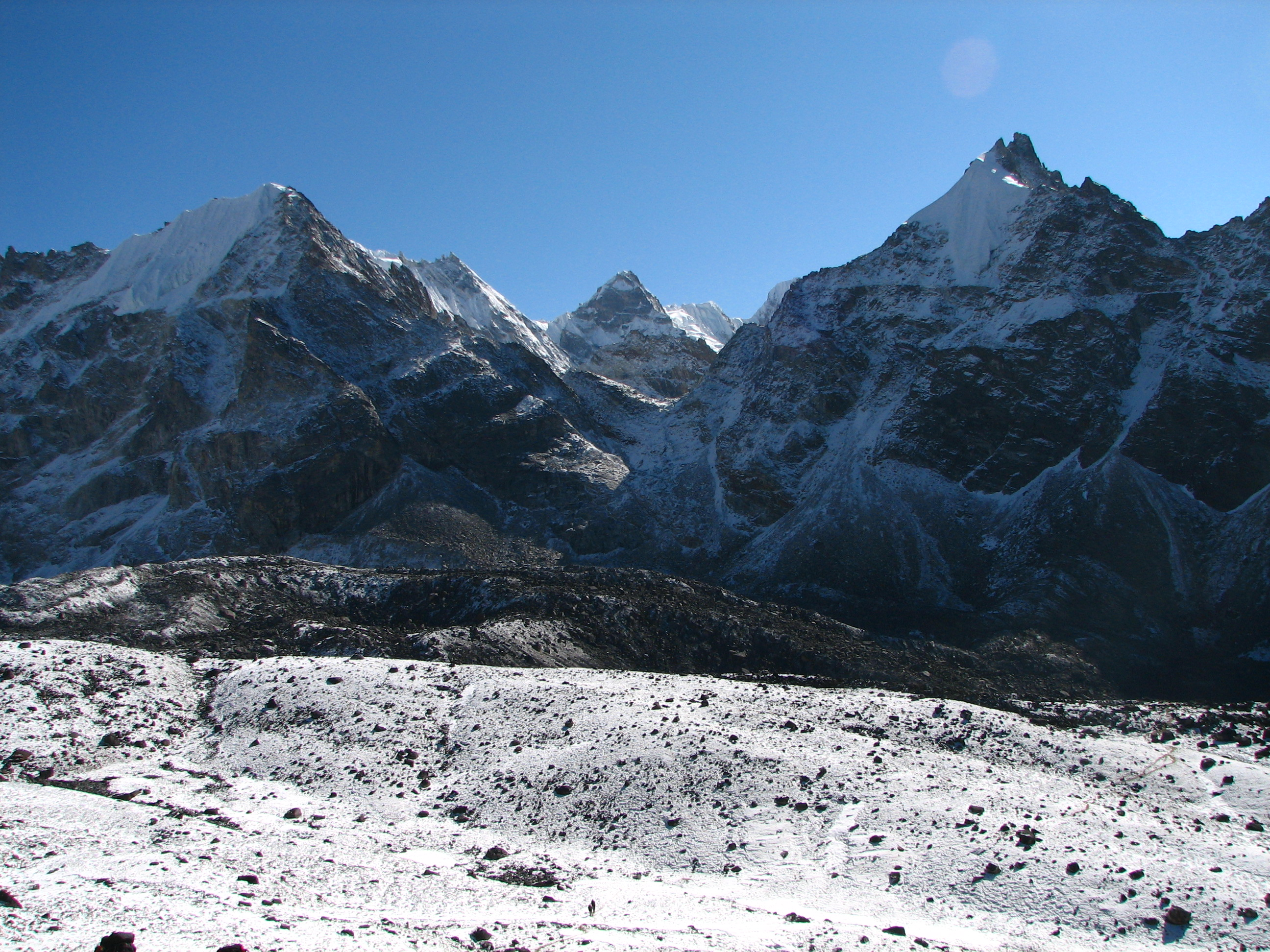
- Cho La pass (centre) from west

- Location within Koshi Province Location within Nepal
- Elevation: 5,420 metres (17,780 ft)

Third Approach
- Location: Solukhumbu District, Nepal
- Range: Himalayas
- Coordinates: 27.962122°N 86.751923°E

Cho La is a summit pass located 5,420 metres (17,782 ft) above sea level in the Solukhumbu District in northeastern Nepal. It connects the village of Dzongla (4,830 metres (15,850 ft)) to the east and the village of Thagnak (4,700 metres (15,400 ft)) to the west.

== Tourism ==
The pass is on the Gokyo trail in the Khumbu Everest region. To the west the trail continues to the Gokyo Lakes, crossing the Ngozumpa glacier on the way. To the east the trail joins the Everest Base Camp trek.

The pass can be physically demanding and may require crampons on top of the slippery glacier. The edge of the glacier is unstable. The Cho la Pass is covered in snow for 9 months of the year, with the temperature being below 0 degrees Celsius for a long time.

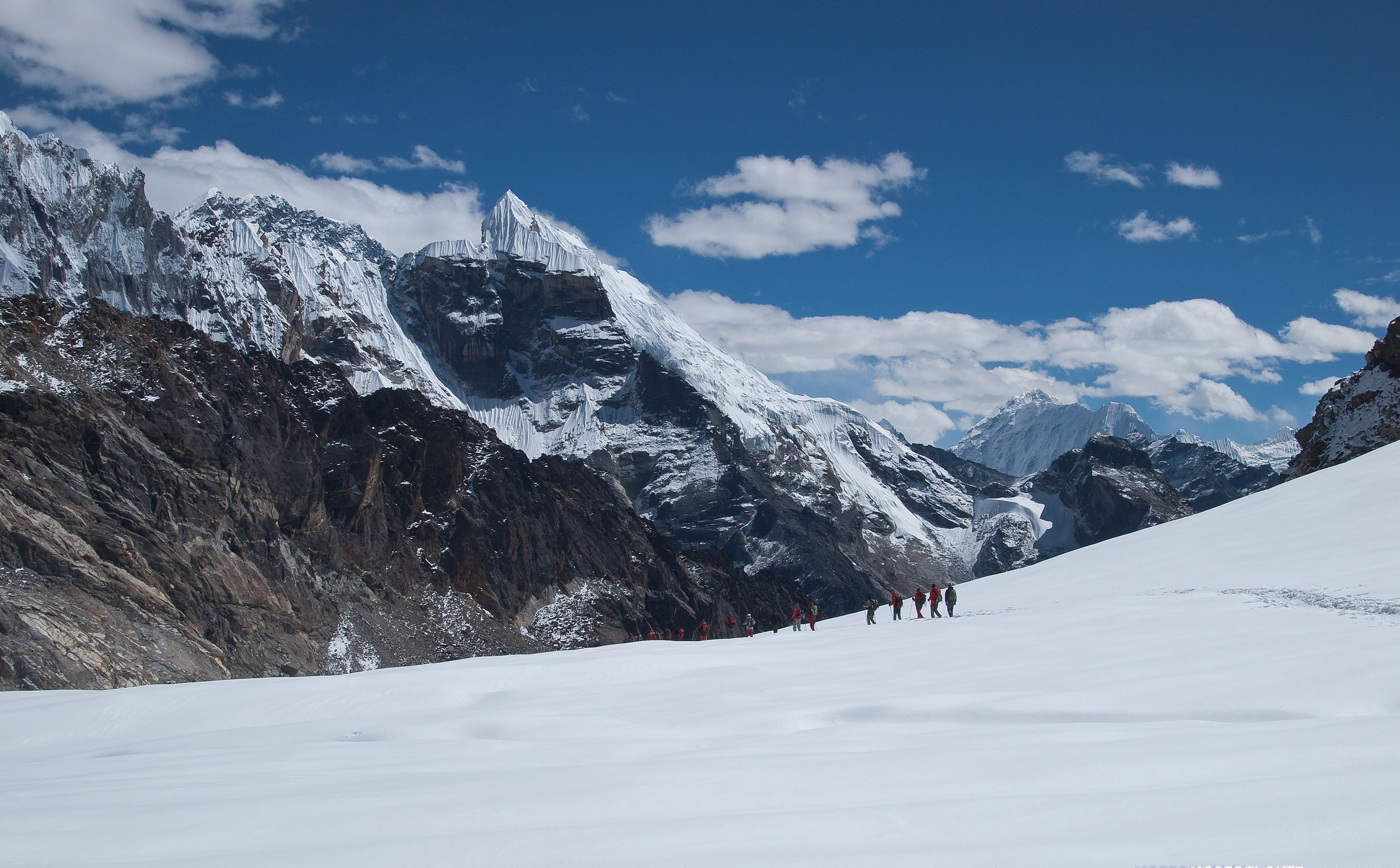
Cho La pass, panoramic view to the east (Lobuche East)

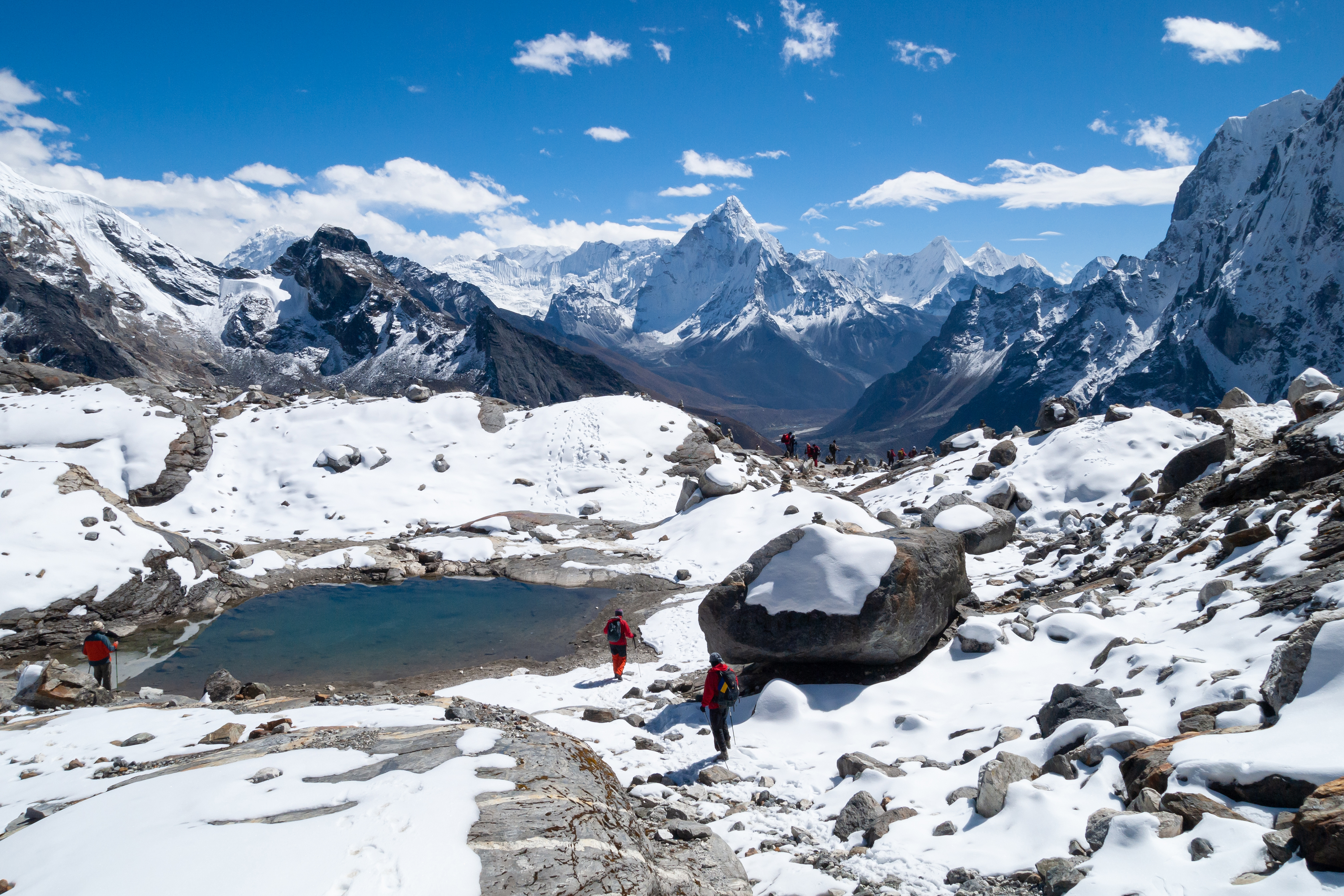
View to the south-east on descending from Cho La Pass into Chola Valley, 5,200 metres (17,100 ft) a. s. l. Glacial lake, rocks covered with snow, Ama Dablam (6,810 metres (22,343 ft)) and other Himalayas

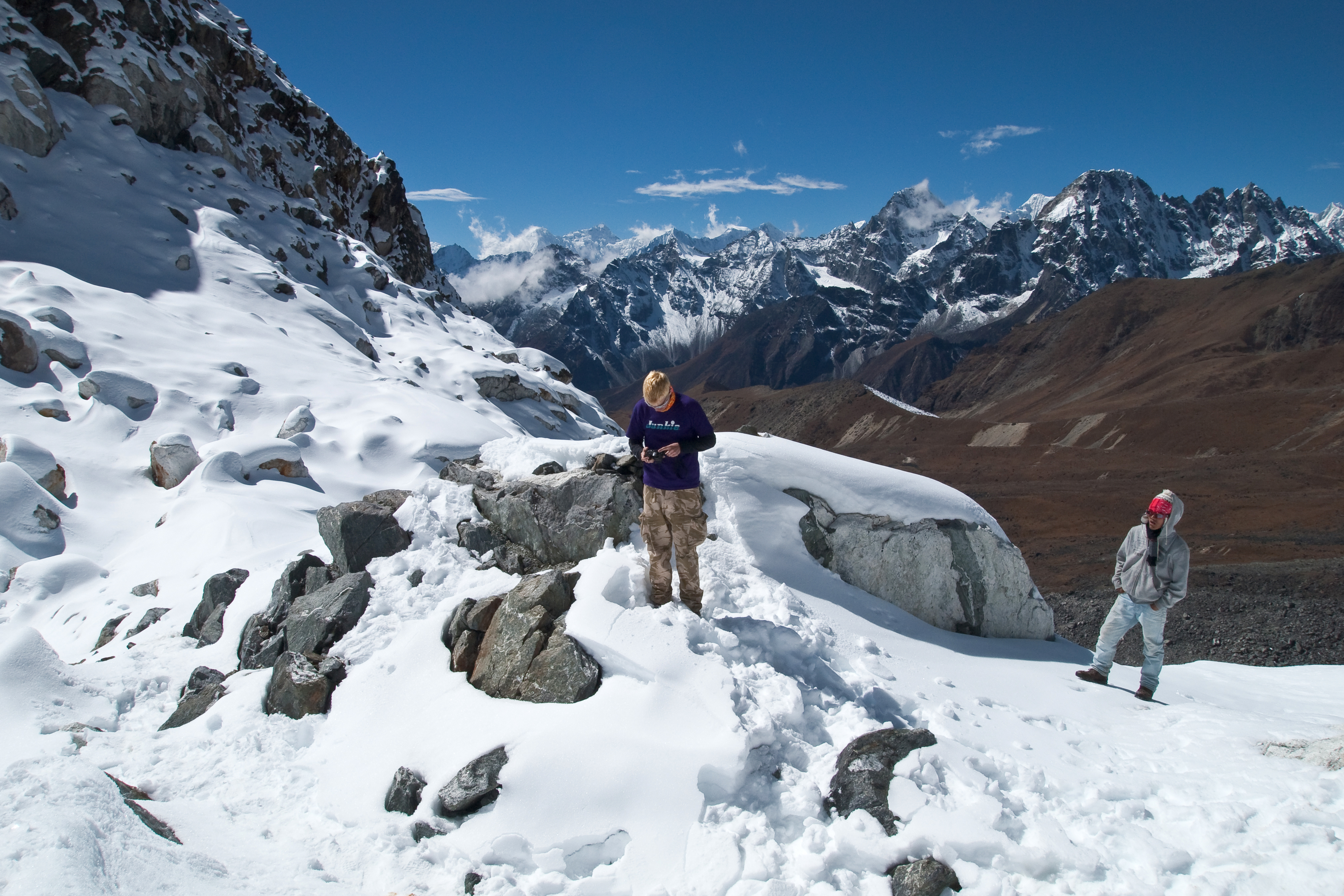
View to the west from Cho La pass
