= Supraglacial lake =

Pond of liquid water on the top of a glacier

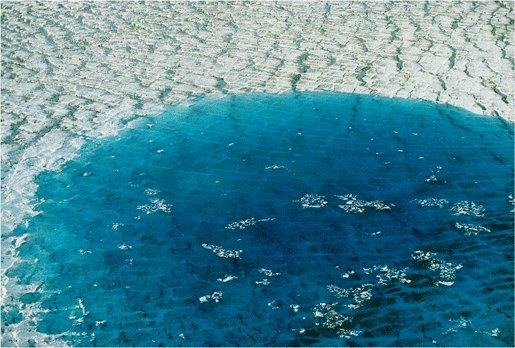
A supraglacial lake on the surface of the Bering Glacier in 1995.

A supraglacial lake is any pond of liquid water on the top of a glacier. Although these pools are ephemeral, they may reach kilometers in diameter and be several meters deep. They may last for months or even decades at a time, but can empty in the course of hours.

== Lifetime ==
Lakes may be created by surface melting during summer months, or over the period of years by rainfall, such as monsoons. They may dissipate by overflowing their banks, or creating a moulin.

== Effects on ice masses ==
Lakes of a diameter greater than ~300 m are capable of driving a fluid-filled crevasse to the glacier/bed interface, through the process of hydrofracture. A surface-to-bed connection made in this way is referred to as a moulin. When these crevasses form, it can take a mere 2–18 hours to empty a lake, supplying warm water to the base of the glacier - lubricating the bed and causing the glacier to surge. The rate of emptying such a lake is equivalent to the rate of flow of the Niagara Falls. Such crevasses, when forming on ice shelves, may penetrate to the underlying ocean and contribute to the breakup of the ice shelf.

Supraglacial lakes also have a warming effect on the glaciers; having a lower albedo than ice, the water absorbs more of the sun's energy, causing warming and (potentially) further melting.

== Context ==
Supraglacial lakes can occur in all glaciated areas.

The retreating glaciers of the Himalaya produce vast and long lived lakes, many kilometres in diameter and scores of metres deep. These may be bounded by moraines; some are deep enough to be density stratified. Most have been growing since the 1950s; the glaciers have been retreating constantly since then.

A proliferation of supraglacial lakes preceded the collapse of the Antarctic Larsen B ice shelf in 2001, and may have been connected.

Such lakes are also prominent in Greenland, where they have recently been understood to contribute somewhat to ice movement.

== Sediments ==
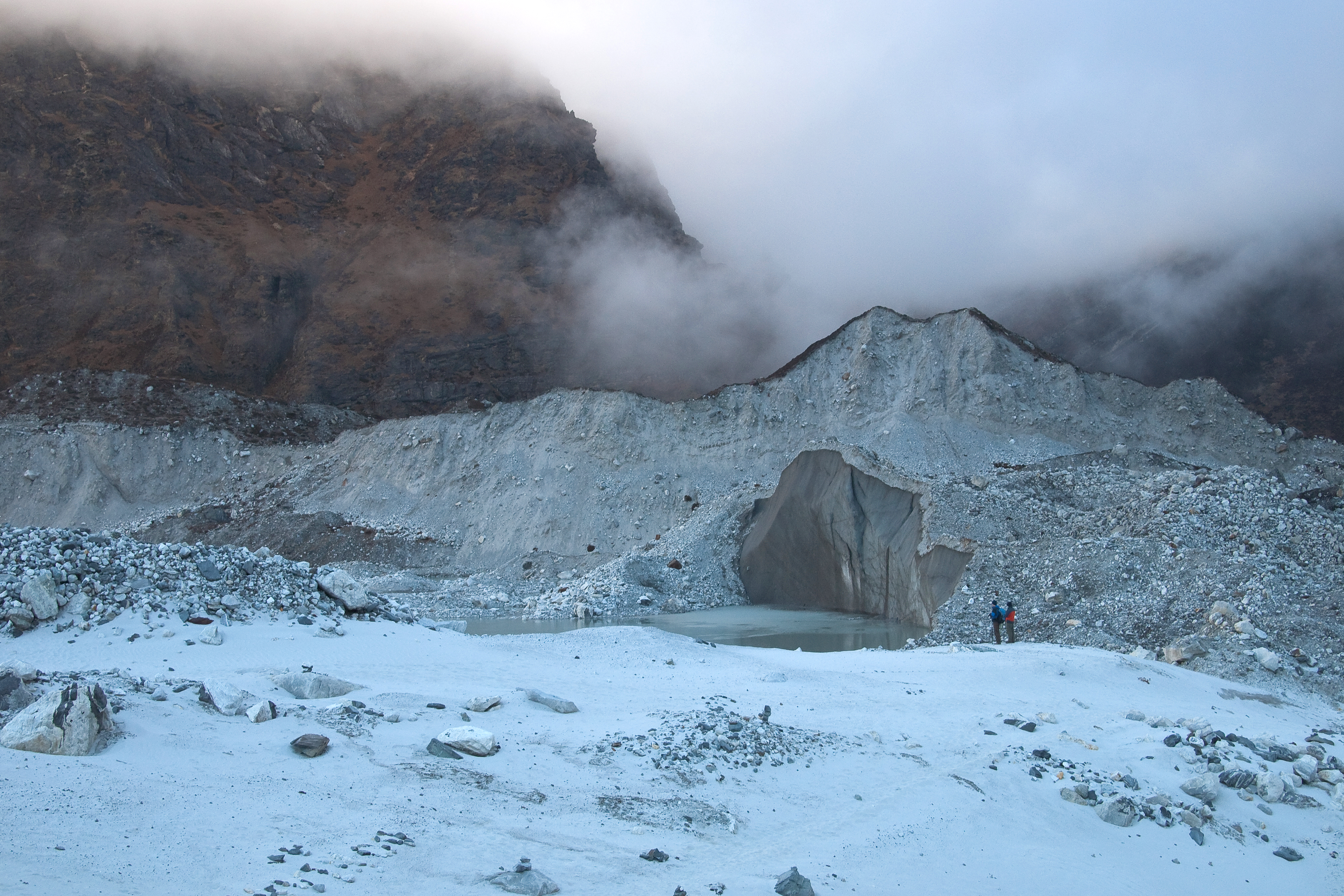
Accumulated supraglacial debris, Ngozumpa glacier.

Sedimentary particles often accumulate in supraglacial lakes; they are washed in by the meltwater or rainwater that supplies the lakes. The character of the sediment depends upon this water source, as well as the proximity of a sampled area to both the edge of the glacier and the edge of the lake. The amount of debris atop the glacier also has a large effect. Naturally, long lived lakes have a different sedimentary record to shorter lived pools.

Sediments are dominated by coarser (coarse sand/gravel) fragments, and the accumulation rate can be immense: up to 1 metre per year near the shores of larger lakes.

Upon melting of the glacier, deposits may be preserved as superglacial till (alias supraglacial moraine).

== Effect of global warming ==
=== Greenland Ice Sheet ===
It was once unclear whether global warming is increasing the abundance of supraglacial lakes on the Greenland Ice Sheet. However, recent research has shown that supraglacial lakes have been forming in new areas. In fact, satellite photos show that since the 1970s, when satellite measurements began, supraglacial lakes have been forming at steadily higher elevations on the ice sheet as warmer air temperatures have caused melting to occur at steadily higher elevations. However, satellite imagery and remote sensing data also reveal that high-elevation lakes rarely form new moulins there. Thus, the role of supraglacial lakes in the basal hydrology of the ice sheet is unlikely to change in the near future: they will continue to bring water to the bed by forming moulins within a few tens of kilometers of the coast.

=== Himalaya ===
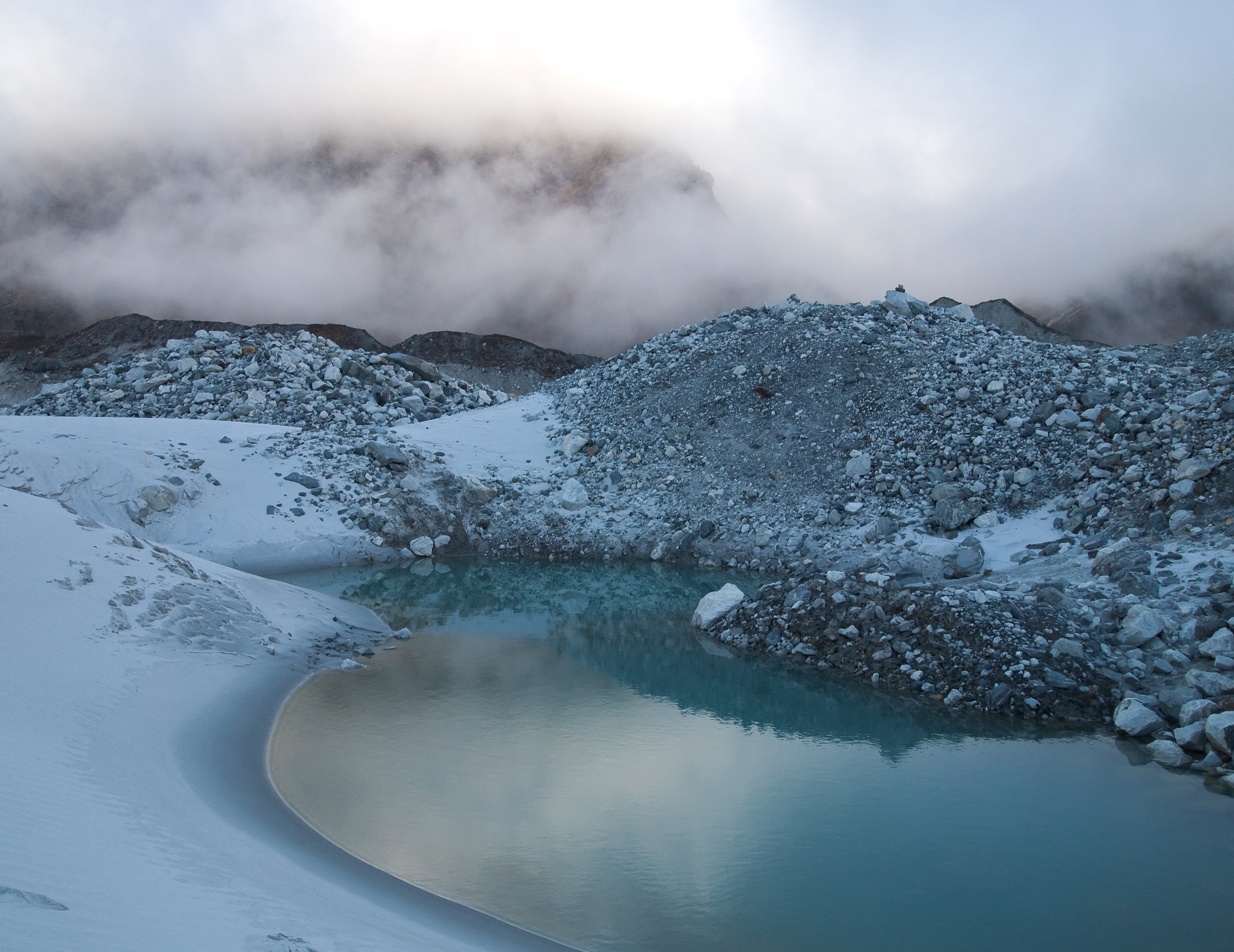
A supraglacial lake on the surface of the Ngozumpa glacier.

Climate change is having a more severe effect on supraglacial lakes on mountain glaciers. In the Himalaya, many glaciers are covered by a thick layer of rocks, dirt, and other debris; this debris layer insulates the ice from the warmth of the sun, allowing more ice to stay solid when air temperatures rise above the melting point. Water collecting on the ice surface has the opposite effect, due to its high albedo as described in a previous section. Thus, more supraglacial lakes lead to a vicious cycle of more melting and more supraglacial lakes. A good example is the Ngozumpa glacier, the longest glacier in the Himalayas, which counts numerous supraglacial lakes.

The drainage of supraglacial lakes on mountain glaciers can disrupt the internal plumbing structure of the glacier. Natural events such as landslides or the slow melting of a frozen moraine can incite drainage of a supraglacial lake, creating a glacial lake outburst flood. In such a flood, the lake water releases rushes down a valley. These events are sudden and catastrophic and thus provide little warning to people who live downstream, in the path of the water. In Himalayan regions, villages cluster around water sources, such as proglacial streams; these streams are the same pathways the glacial lake outburst floods travel down.
