= Chumbu (mountain) =

Mountain in Nepal

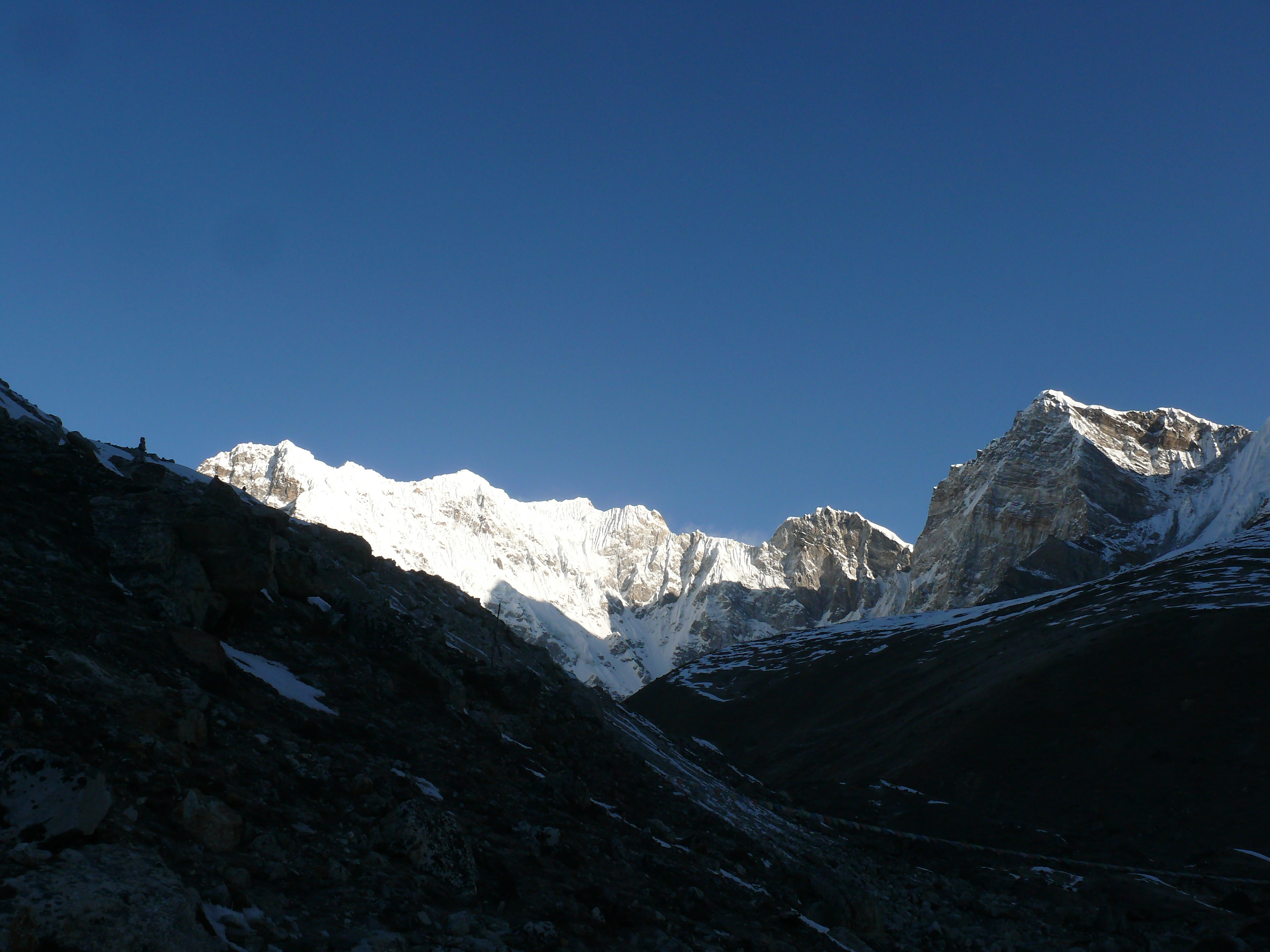

Highest point
- Elevation: 6,859 m (22,503 ft)
- Prominence: 541 m (1,775 ft)
- Coordinates: 28°00′49″N 86°47′17″E

Geography
- Location within Koshi Province Location within Nepal Location within Tibet
- Location: Solukhumbu District, Sagarmatha Zone, Nepal
- Parent range: Mahalangur Himal, Himalayas

Climbing
- First ascent: November 3, 2022: Czech team, led by Piolet d’Or winner Zdenek Hak summited the unclimbed Chumbu

Chumbu is a mountain in the Nepal Himalayas near the border of the Tibet Autonomous Region of China. It falls under Eastern Development Region Solukhumbu Nepal.

== Climbing history ==
On November 3, 2022 a Czech team, led by Piolet d'Or winner Zdenek Hak summited the unclimbed Chumbu peak for the first time accompanied by Radek Groh, Jaroslav Bánsky and Petr Kejklíček. A fifth member, Juraj Koren of Slovakia, planned to paraglide from the summit but was fallen ill by dengue and could not start the climb. It was previously attempted by a Korean team and French teams. The French climbed the southwest pillar in 2016 but didn't reach the main summit
