= Gokyo Lakes =

Lakes in Nepal

- Nepali: गोक्यो ताल
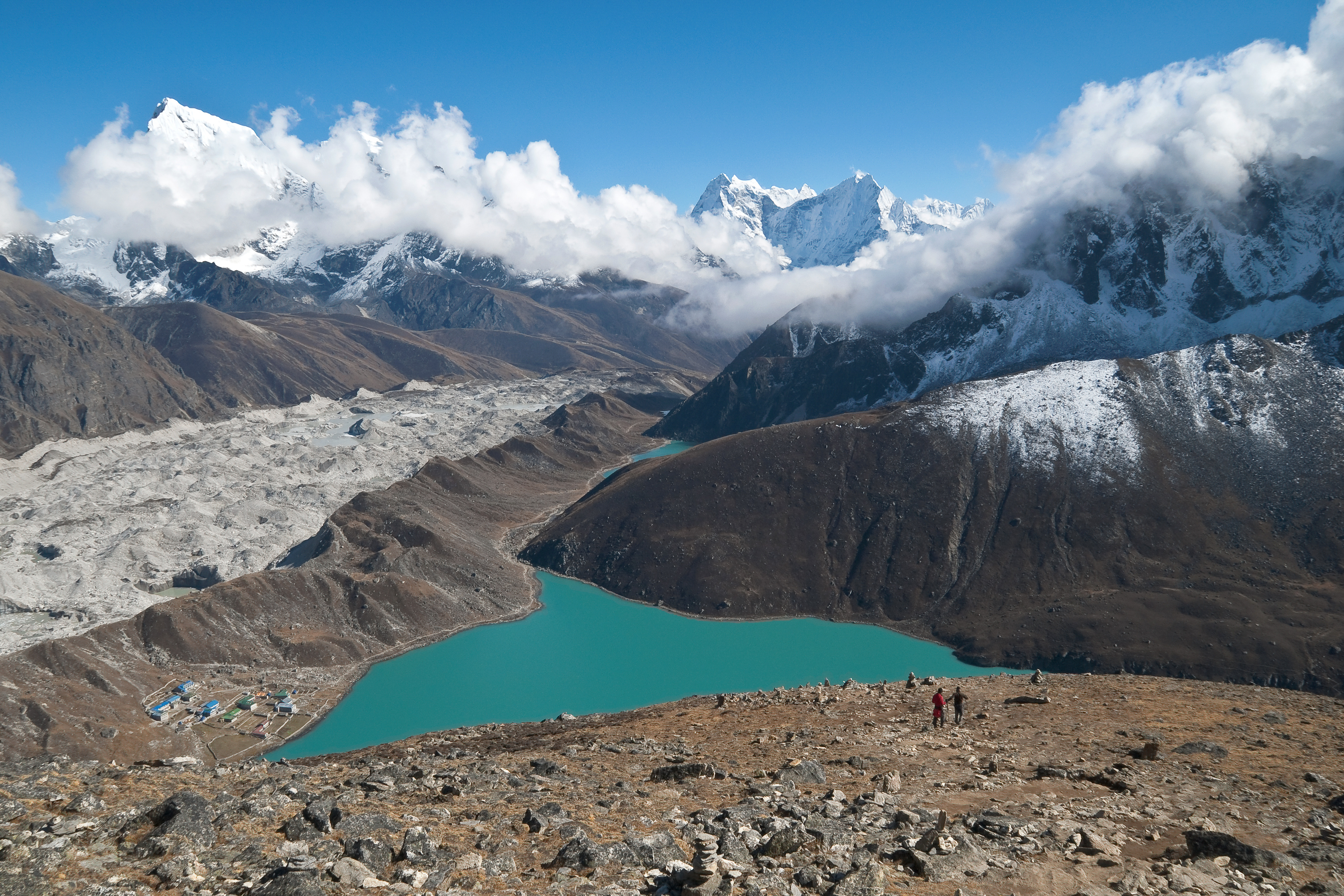
- Gokyo Lakes

- Location within Koshi Province Location within Nepal Location within South Asia
- Interactive map of Gokyo Lakes
- Location: Solukhumbu District
- Coordinates: 27°58′49″N 86°40′07″E
- Basin countries: Nepal
- Surface area: 196.2 ha (485 acres)
- Surface elevation: 4,700–5,000 m (15,400–16,400 ft)

Ramsar Wetland
- Official name: Gokyo and associated lakes
- Designated: 13 September 2007
- Reference no.: 1692

Gokyo Lakes are oligotrophic lakes in Nepal's Sagarmatha National Park, located at an elevation of 4,700–5,000 m (15,400–16,400 ft). They were named after Gokyo Ri peak. In September 2007, Gokyo and its associated wetlands of 7,770 ha (77.7 km^{2}) have been designated a Ramsar site.

== Lake system ==
Gokyo Lakes are located in the Khumjung Village Development Committee of Solukhumbu District in the Sagarmatha Zone in north-eastern Nepal. Gokyo Cho, also called Dudh Pokhari, is the main lake with an area of 42.9 ha (106 acres), and the village of Gokyo lies on its eastern shore. Thonak Cho is the largest lake with an area of 65.07 ha (160.8 acres). Gyazumpa Cho is 29 ha (72 acres) in size, followed by Tanjung Cho with an area of 16.95 ha (41.9 acres), and Ngojumba Cho with an area of 14.39 ha (35.6 acres). As sources of permanent fresh water they have high hydrological value. They feed on waters from various sources, such as seepage from the Ngozumpa glacier, a stream coming from the Renjo La pass from the north-west and another stream originating from the Ngozumpa glacier in the east. These are glacier-fed freshwater wetlands and discharge water to the Dudh Kosi headway via Taujon Lake and Longabanga Lake. These lakes are deeper than previously assumed by the researchers. Fourth Lake (Thonak Cho) is the deepest lake (62.4 m) followed by Gokyo Lake which is 43 m. A direct connection between the Gokyo Lake and the upper Thonak Cho and the Ngozumpa Cho has not been observed, but these lakes may be connected via underground seepage water. The Gokyo Lake system is naturally vulnerable, as it lies in an ecologically fragile and unstable zone. The outburst of the Ngozumpa glacier is always a threat to the existence of the lakes.

These 19 lakes are spread over an area of 196.2 ha (485 acres) lying between 4,710 and 4,950 m (15,450 and 16,240 ft). The wetland lies at the Dudh Kosi, which descends from Cho Oyu.

== Religious significance ==
The Gokyo Lakes are considered sacred by both Hindus and Buddhists. About 500 Hindus take a holy bath in the lakes during the Janai Purnima festival, which usually occurs in the month of August. On an average 7,000 tourists annually visit the Gokyo Lakes.
