= Ngozumpa glacier =

Longest glacier in the Himalayas

Ngozumpa
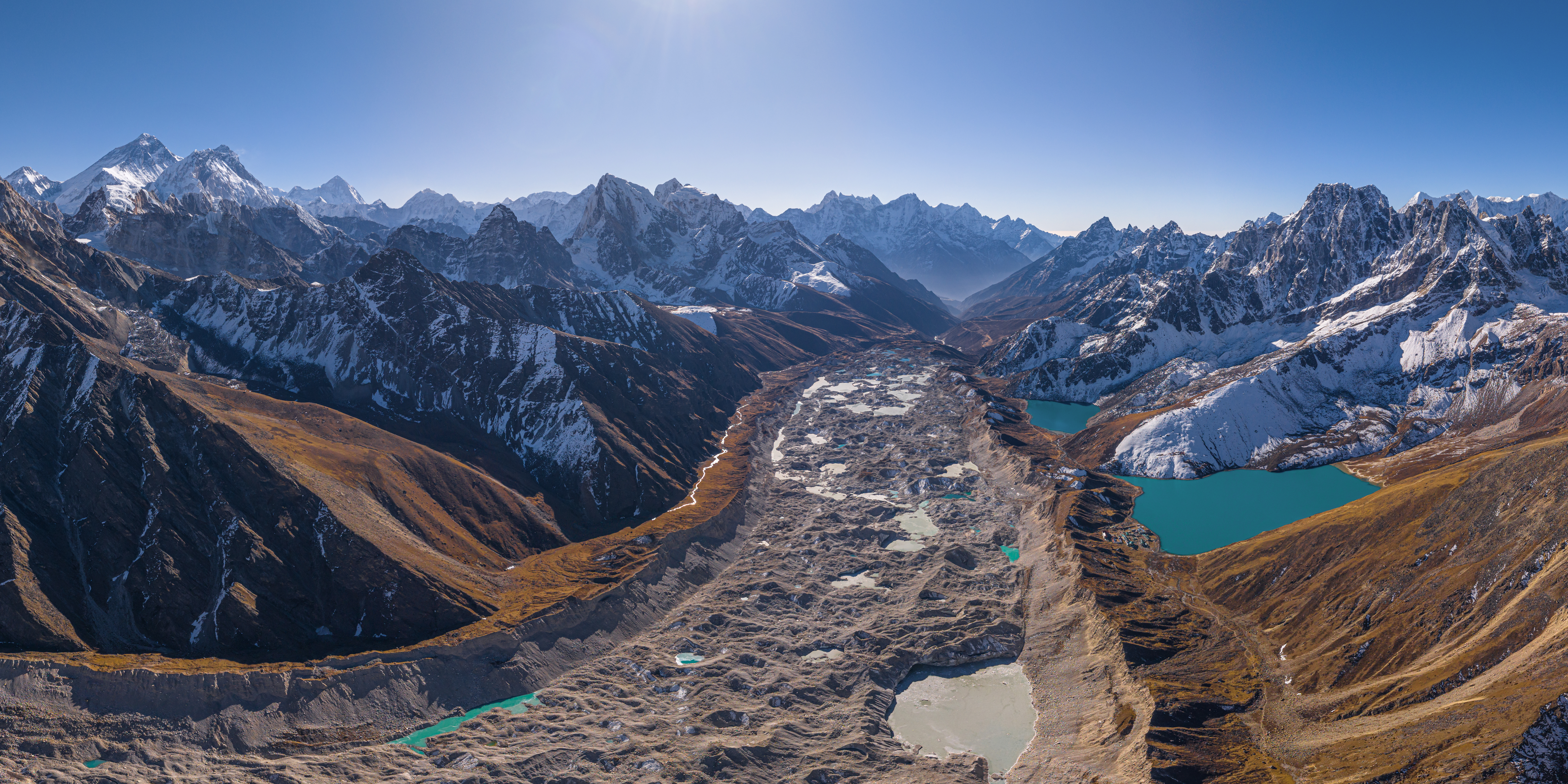
- Aerial view of Ngozumpa glacier and surrounding area

- Location within Nepal Location within Tibet
- Interactive map of Ngozumpa
- Type: Valley glacier
- Location: Nepal
- Coordinates: 27°59′30″N 86°41′30″E

The Ngozumpa glacier, below the sixth highest mountain in the world Cho Oyu in Nepal, at 36 kilometres (22 mi), is the longest glacier in the Himalayas. Ngozumpa Glacier is a large persistent body of ice. It flows slowly due to stresses induced by its weight.

== Ngozumpa Spillway lake ==
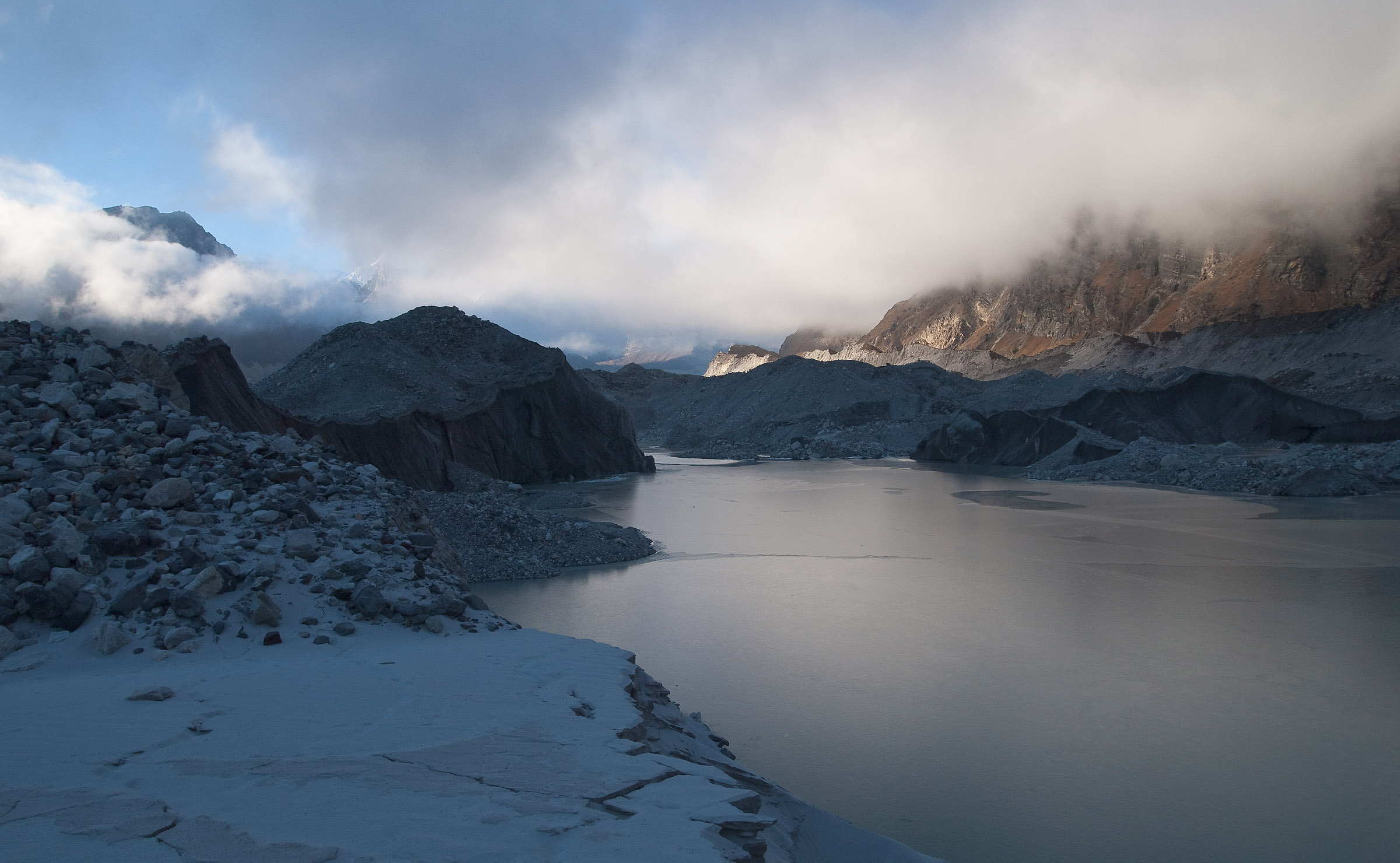
The core of Ngozumpa glacier, and emerging Spillway lake

The Nepali Himalayas have been warming significantly over recent decades. Ngozumpa glacier is showing signs of shrinking and thinning, producing melt water. Some of this water pools on the surface where an enormous lake is growing. This lake, called Spillway, has the potential to be about 6 kilometres (3.7 mi) long, 1 kilometre (0.62 mi) wide and 100 metres (330 ft) deep. In the future this might be a threat to the Sherpa villages down the valley.

== Gallery ==
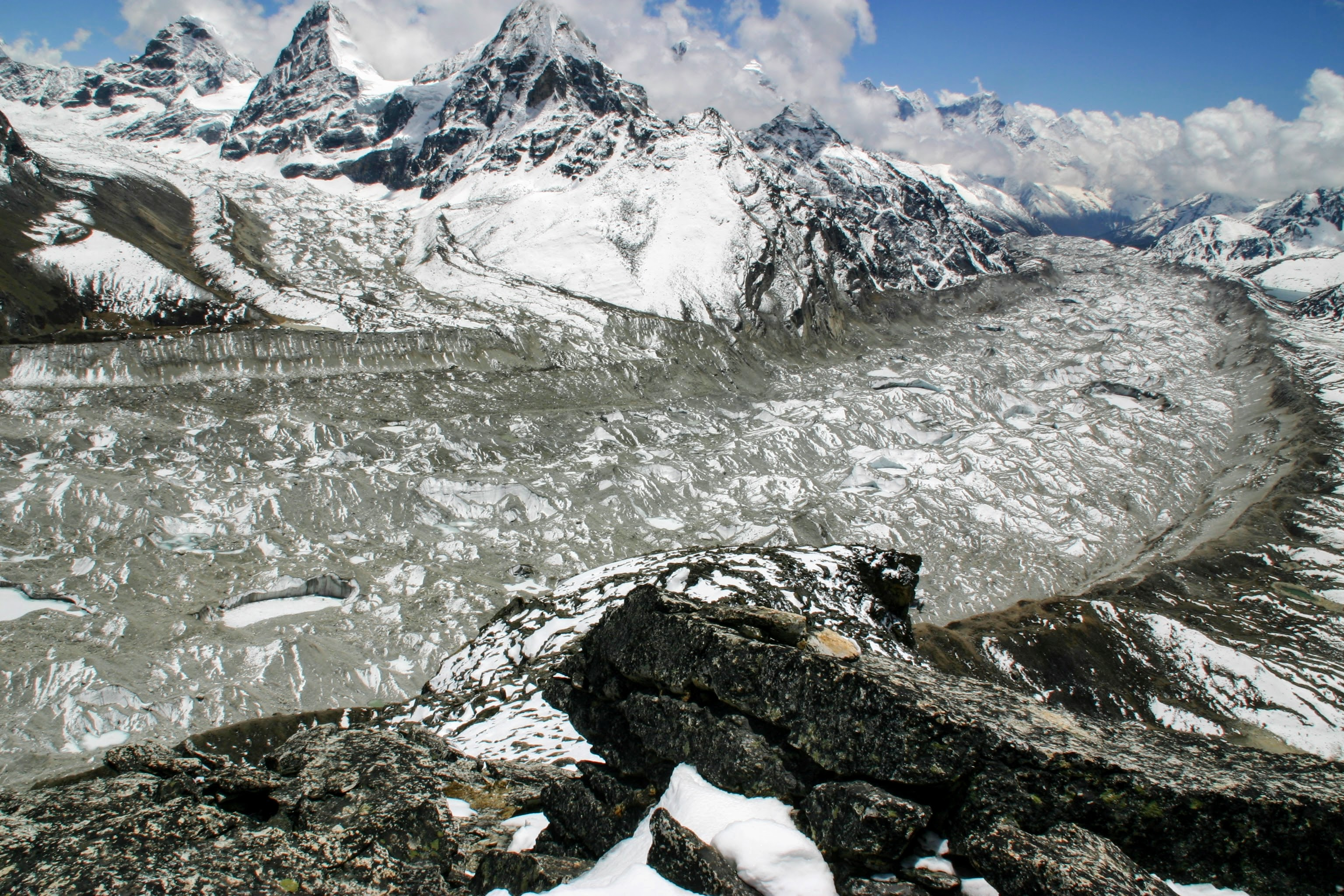
The Ngozumpa glacier seen from the Ngozumpa Tse

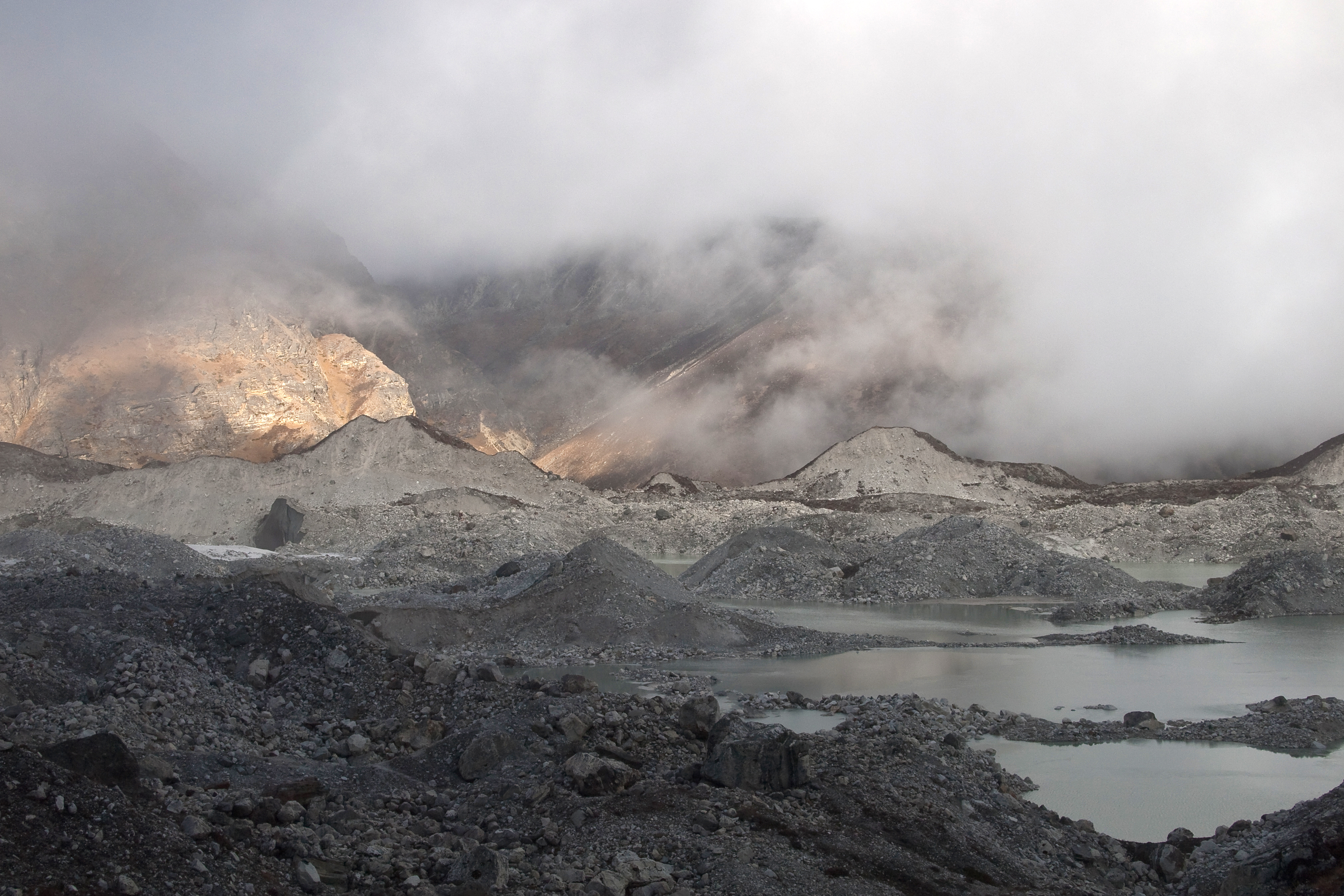
Supraglacial lakes

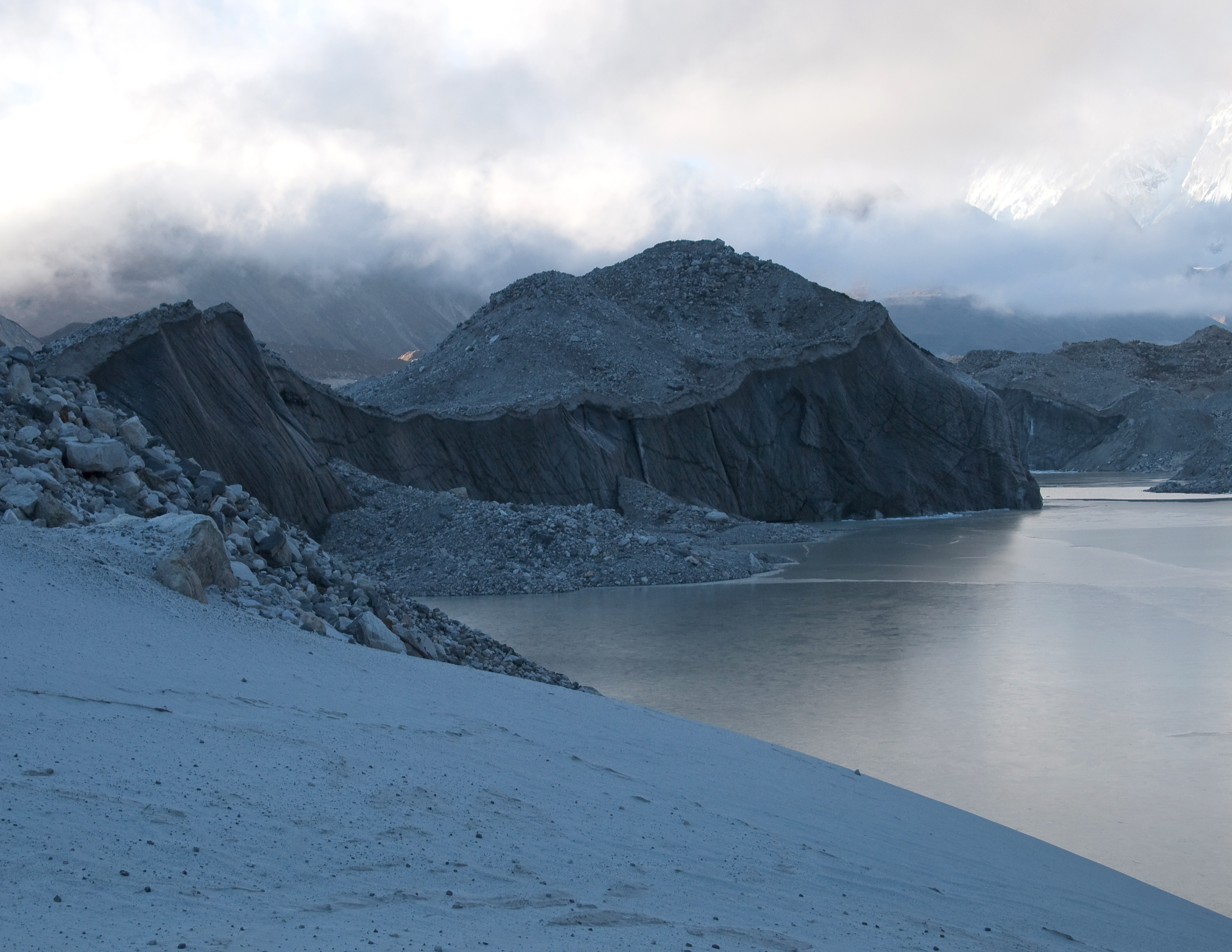

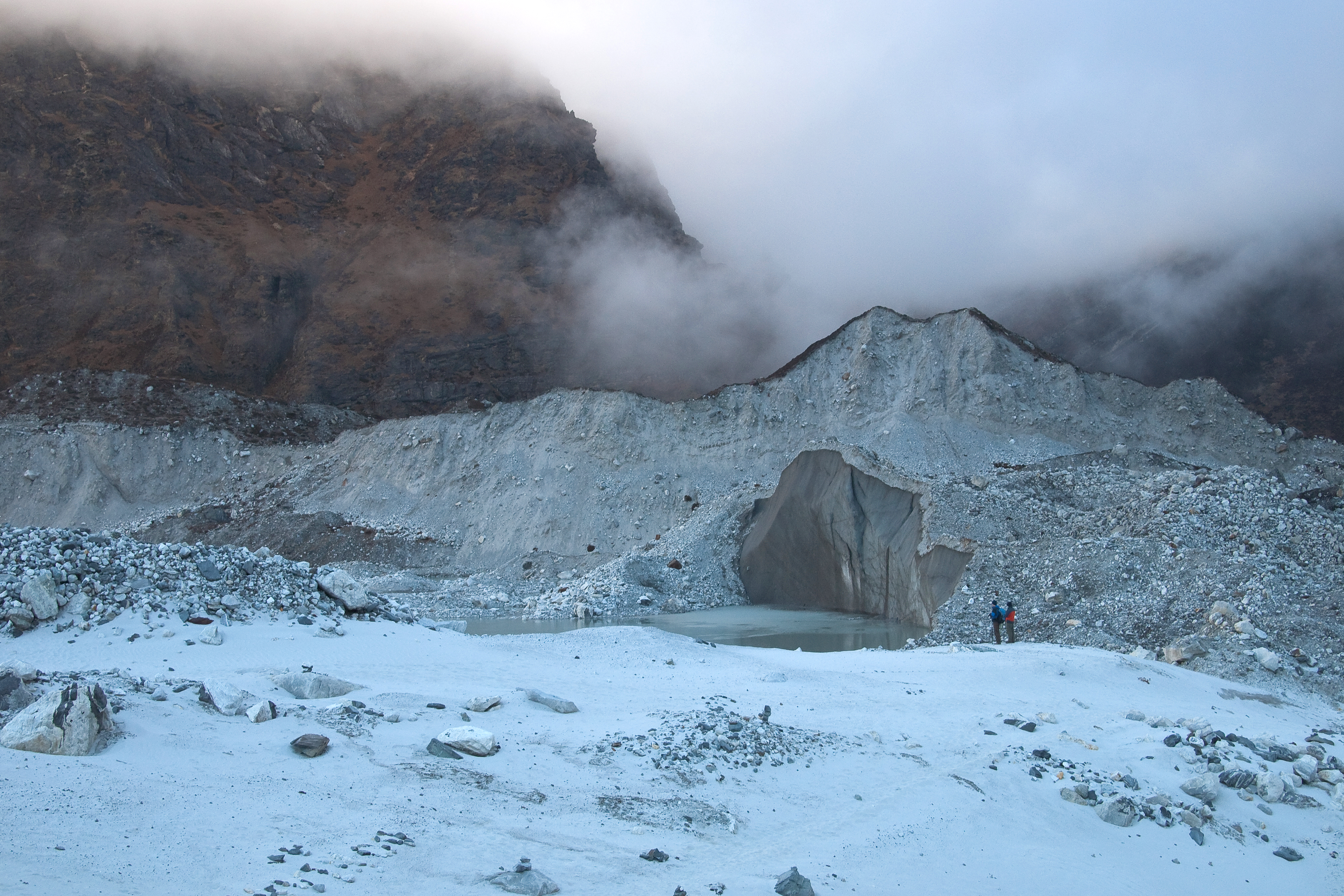

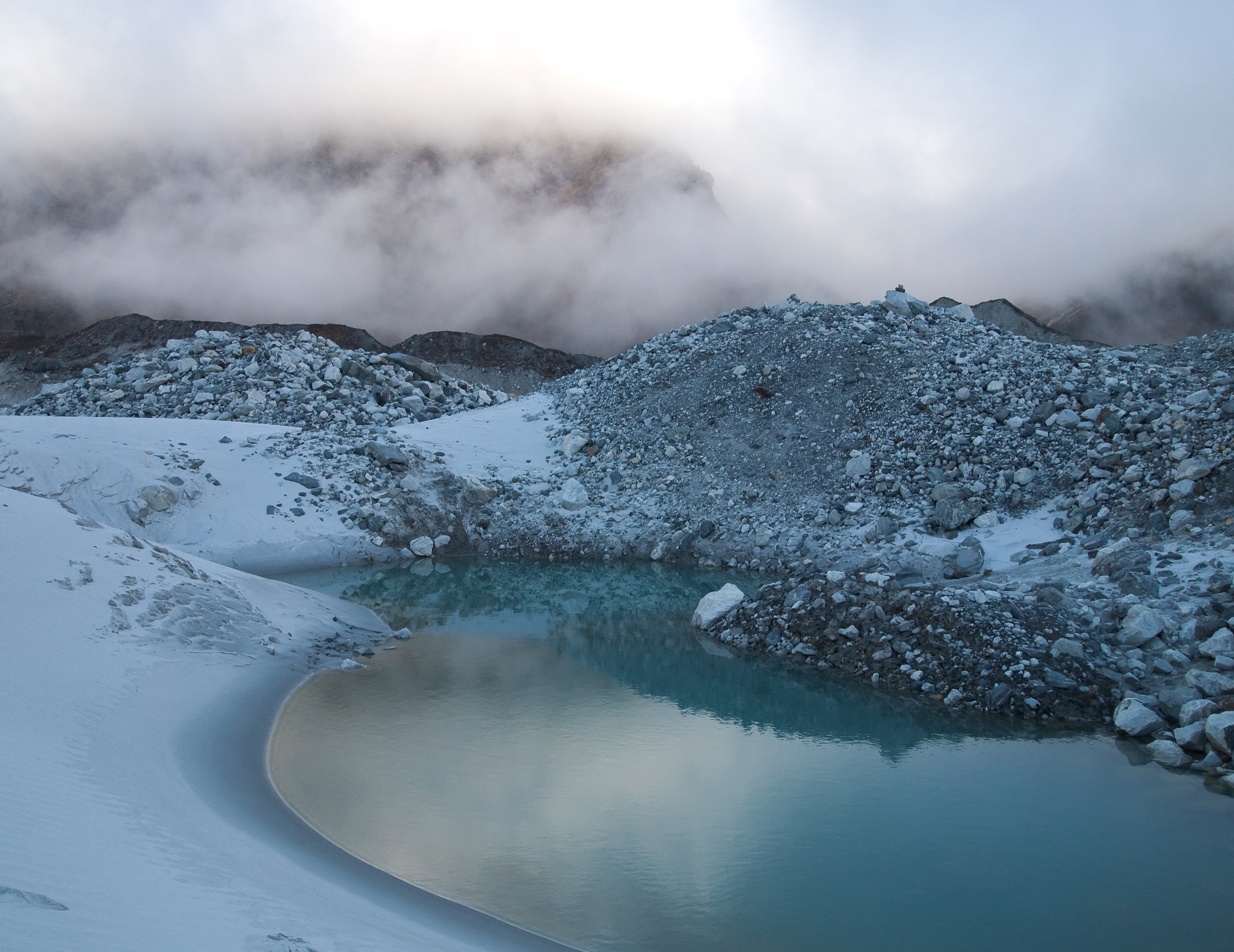

== See also ==
- Gokyo Lakes
