= Nordic countries =

Geographical and cultural region

Nordic countries: Norden (Danish, Norwegian, Swedish); Nordę (Elfdalian); Pohjoismaat (Finnish); Norðurlöndin (Icelandic); Norðurlond (Faroese); Nunat Avannarliit (Greenlandic); Davviriikkat (Northern Sami); Nuorttarijkka (Lule Sami); Tave-enâmeh (Inari Sami); Noerhtelaanten (Southern Sami); Tâʹvvjânnam (Skolt Sami)
- Land controlled by the Nordic countries shown in dark green. Bouvet Island and Antarctic claims not shown.
- Capitals: (Denmark) Copenhagen; (Finland) Helsinki; (Iceland) Reykjavík; (Norway) Oslo; (Sweden) Stockholm; (Faroe Islands) Tórshavn; (Greenland) Nuuk; (Åland) Mariehamn
- Largest city: (Sweden) Stockholm
- Official languages: Danish; Finnish; Icelandic; Norwegian; Swedish; Faroese; Greenlandic; Sami
- Recognised regional languages: Meänkieli; Karelian; Kven; German; Romani; Tavringer; Yiddish
- Religion: Mainly Lutheranism
- Composition: 5 sovereign states: Denmark; Finland; Iceland; Norway; Sweden; 2 autonomous territories: Faroe Islands; Greenland; 1 autonomous region: Åland; 2 unincorporated areas: Jan Mayen; Svalbard; 1 dependency: Bouvet Island; 2 Antarctic claims: Peter I Island; Queen Maud Land

Establishment
  - Inauguration of the Nordic Council: 12 February 1953
  - Helsinki Treaty: 23 March 1962
  - Inauguration of the Nordic Council of Ministers: July 1971

Population
  - 2026 estimate: 28,451,234 (54nd)
  - 2000 census: 24,221,754
  - Density: 8.30/km^{2} (21.5/sq mi) (225th)
- GDP (PPP): 2026 estimate
  - Total: $2.45 trillion
  - Per capita: $86,200
- GDP (nominal): 2026 estimate
  - Total: $2.25 trillion
  - Per capita: $79,200
- Currency: 5 currencies; (Denmark) (Faroe Islands) (Greenland) Danish krone; (Finland) (Åland) Euro; (Iceland) Icelandic króna; (Norway) Norwegian krone; (Sweden) Swedish krona
- Calling code: +45 (Denmark); +46 (Sweden); +47 (Norway); +298 (Faroe Islands); +299 (Greenland); +354 (Iceland); +358 (Finland); +358 18 (Åland)

The Nordic countries (also known as the Nordics or Norden; lit. 'the North') are a geographical and cultural region in Northern Europe and North America, as well as the Arctic and North Atlantic oceans. It includes the sovereign states of Denmark, Finland, Iceland, Norway, (Note: Two unincorporated territories in the Arctic Ocean, Svalbard and Jan Mayen, are considered integral parts of the Kingdom of Norway and are sometimes included in definitions of the Nordic countries. Norway's three dependencies in the Southern Hemisphere (Bouvet Island and two areas subject to the Antarctic Treaty System, Peter I Island and Queen Maud Land), all of which are uninhabited and geographically remote from the Nordic region, are not generally included in the term.) and Sweden, the autonomous territories of the Faroe Islands and Greenland, and the autonomous region of Åland.

The Nordic countries have much in common in their way of life, history, religion and social and economic model. They have a long history of political unions, such as the Kalmar Union, and other close relations but do not form a singular state or federation today. The Scandinavist movement sought to unite Denmark, Norway and Sweden into one country in the 19th century. With the dissolution of the union between Sweden and Norway (Norwegian independence), the independence of Finland in the early 20th century and the 1944 Icelandic constitutional referendum, this movement expanded into the modern organised Nordic cooperation. Since 1962, this cooperation has been based on the Helsinki Treaty that sets the framework for the Nordic Council and Nordic Council of Ministers.

The Nordic countries cluster near the top in numerous metrics of national performance, including education, economic competitiveness, civil liberties, quality of life and human development. Each country has its own economic and social model, sometimes with large differences from its neighbours. Still, they share aspects of the Nordic model of economy and social structure to varying degrees. This includes a mixed market economy combined with strong labour unions and a universalist welfare sector financed by high taxes, enhancing individual autonomy and promoting social mobility. There is a high degree of income redistribution, commitment to private ownership and little social unrest.

North Germanic peoples, who comprise over three-quarters of the region's population, are the largest ethnic group, followed by the Baltic Finnic Peoples, who comprise the majority in Finland; other ethnic groups are the Greenlandic Inuit, the Sami people and recent immigrants and their descendants. Historically, the main religion in the region was Norse paganism. This gave way first to Roman Catholicism after the Christianisation of Scandinavia. Then, following the Protestant Reformation, the main religion became Lutheran Christianity, the state religion of several Nordic countries.

Although the area is linguistically heterogeneous, with three unrelated language groups, the common linguistic heritage is one factor that makes up the Nordic identity. Most Nordic languages belong to one of the North Germanic, Finno-Ugric, and Eskimo-Aleut language families. Danish, Norwegian and Swedish are considered mutually intelligible, and they are the working languages of the region's two political bodies. Swedish is a mandatory subject in Finnish schools and Danish in Faroese schools. Danish is also taught in schools in Iceland.

The combined area of the Nordic countries is 3,425,804 square kilometres (1,322,710 sq mi). Uninhabitable ice caps and glaciers comprise about half of this area, mainly Greenland. In September 2021, the region had over 27 million people. Especially in English, Scandinavia is sometimes used as a synonym for the Nordic countries, but that term more properly refers to the three monarchies of Denmark, Norway and Sweden. Geologically, the Scandinavian Peninsula comprises the mainland of Norway and Sweden and the northernmost part of Finland.

== Etymology and concept of the Nordic countries ==
The term Nordic countries found mainstream use after the advent of Foreningen Norden. The term is derived indirectly from the local term Norden, used in the North Germanic (Scandinavian) languages, which means 'The North(ern lands)'. Unlike the Nordic countries, the term Norden is in the singular. The demonym is nordbo, literally meaning 'northern dweller'.

Similar or related regional terms include:

- Scandinavia refers typically to the cultural and linguistic group formed by Denmark, Norway and Sweden, or the Scandinavian Peninsula, which is formed by mainland Norway and Sweden as well as the northwesternmost part of Finland. Outside of the Nordic region the term Scandinavia is sometimes used as a synonym for the Nordic countries. First recorded use of the name by Pliny the Elder about a "large, fertile island in the North" (possibly referring to Scania).
- Fennoscandia refers to the area that includes the Scandinavian Peninsula, Finland, Kola Peninsula and Karelia. This term is mostly restricted to geology, when speaking of the Fennoscandian Shield.
- Cap of the North consists of the provinces and counties of Lapland in Finland; Finnmark, Nordland and Troms in Norway; and Lapland and Norrbotten in Sweden. This Arctic area is located around and north of the Arctic Circle, within Norway, Sweden, Finland and the Kola Peninsula in Russia.
- Barents Region is formed by the Cap of the North as well as the Northern Ostrobothnia and Kainuu regions of Finland, Swedish provinces of Lapland, Västerbotten and Norrbotten, Russian Oblasts of Arkhangelsk and Murmansk, Nenets Autonomous Okrug, as well as the Republics of Karelia and Komi. This area cooperates through the Barents Euro-Arctic Council and Barents Regional Council.
Nordic countries (orange and red) and Scandinavian countries (red)

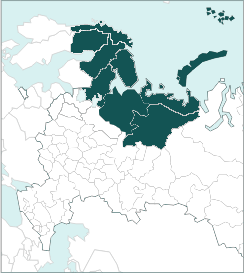
The Barents Region

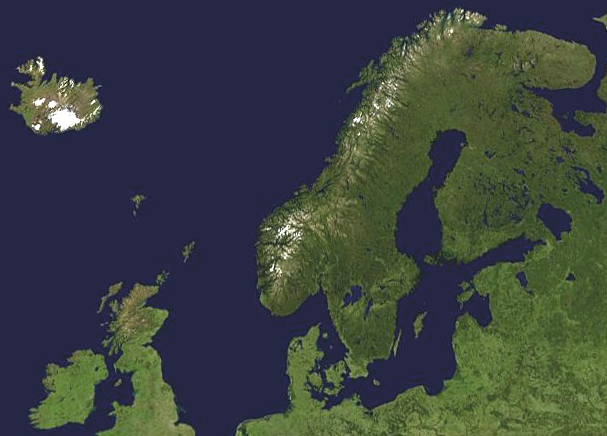
A satellite composite of Northern Europe

== List ==
=== Sovereign states ===
Sovereign state	Kingdom of Denmark	Republic of Finland	Iceland	Kingdom of Norway	Kingdom of Sweden
Flag	Denmark	Finland	Iceland	Norway	Sweden
Coat of arms	Denmark	Finland	Iceland	Norway	Sweden
Official local name	Kongeriget Danmark	Suomen tasavalta Republiken Finland	Ísland	Kongeriket Norge; Kongeriket Noreg; Norgga gonagasriika	Konungariket Sverige
Local common name	Danmark	Suomi; Finland	Ísland	Norge; Noreg; Norga	Sverige
English common name	Denmark	Finland	Iceland	Norway	Sweden
Population (2021 estimate)	5,894,687	5,587,442	354,234	5,509,591	10,261,767
Area	43,094 km^{2}	338,145 km^{2}	103,000 km^{2}	385,207 km^{2}	450,295 km^{2}
Population density (2015 estimate)	129.5/km^{2}	16.2/km^{2}	3.2/km^{2}	13.5/km^{2}	22.9/km^{2}
Capital city	Copenhagen	Helsinki	Reykjavík	Oslo	Stockholm
Largest urban areas	Copenhagen – 2,135,634; Aarhus – 330,639; Odense – 213,558; Aalborg – 205,809; Esbjerg – 116,032	Helsinki – 1,576,438; Tampere – 370,084; Turku – 315,751; Oulu – 200,400; Jyväskylä – 140,812	Reykjavík – 247,590; Akureyri – 18,103; Reykjanesbær – 14,000; Akranes – 6,699; Selfoss – 6,512	Oslo – 1,546,706; Bergen – 265,470; Stavanger/Sandnes – 229,911; Trondheim – 191,771; Fredrikstad/Sarpsborg – 117,510	Stockholm – 2,415,139; Gothenburg – 1,015,974; Malmö – 707,120; Helsingborg – 272,873; Uppsala – 253,704
Form of government	Unitary parliamentary constitutional monarchy	Unitary parliamentary republic	Unitary parliamentary republic	Unitary parliamentary constitutional monarchy	Unitary parliamentary constitutional monarchy
Current head of state and government	Frederik X (King); Mette Frederiksen (Prime Minister)	Alexander Stubb (President); Petteri Orpo (Prime Minister)	Halla Tómasdóttir (President); Kristrún Frostadóttir (Prime Minister)	Haakon VIII (King); Jonas Gahr Støre (Prime Minister)	Carl XVI Gustaf (King); Ulf Kristersson (Prime Minister)
European Free Trade Association	No	No	Yes	Yes	No
European Union	Yes	Yes	No	No	Yes
European Economic Area	Yes	Yes	Yes	Yes	Yes
Official languages	Danish	Finnish and Swedish	Icelandic	Norwegian and Sami	Swedish
Official or recognized minority languages	German (in South Jutland)	Sami, Romani, Sign Language, Karelian	Icelandic Sign Language	Kven, Tavringer, Romani	Finnish, Sami, Romani, Yiddish and Meänkieli
Main religions	74.8% Lutheran; 5.3% Islam; 19.9% other, unspecified or no religion	67.8% Lutheran; 1.1% Orthodox; 1.7% other religion 29.4% unspecified or no religion	63.5% Lutheran; 11.7% other Christian; 3.3% other religion 21.5% unspecified or no religion	68.7% Lutheran; 7.0% other Christian; 3.4% Islam; 0.8% other religion 20.2% no religion	60.2% Lutheran; 8.5% other 31.3% no religion
GDP (nominal) (2016)	$306.7 billion	$236.8 billion	$20.0 billion	$370.4 billion	$511.3 billion
GDP (nominal) per capita (2016)	$53,744	$43,169	$59,629	$70,392	$51,165
GDP (PPP) (2016)	$273.8 billion	$231.3 billion	$16.5 billion	$364.4 billion	$498.1 billion
GDP (PPP) per capita (2016)	$47,985	$42,165	$49,136	$69,249	$49,836
Real GDP growth rate (2019 est.)	2.85%	1.15%	1.94%	0.86%	1.29%
Currency	Danish krone	Euro	Icelandic króna	Norwegian krone	Swedish krona
Military expenditure	2.4% of GDP	2.50% of GDP	0.13% of GDP	1.4% of GDP	1.18% of GDP
Military personnel	72,135	900,000	130	69,700	57,000
Labour force	2,962,340	2,677,260	197,200	2,781,420	5,268,520
Human Development Index rank (2021 data, 2022 report)	6	11	3	2	7
Corruption Perceptions Index rank (2022)	1	2	14	4	5
Press Freedom Index rank (2022)	2	5	15	1	3
Fragile States Index rank (2022)	175	179	177	178	170
Economic Freedom rank (2023)	10	9	13	14	11
Global Competitiveness rank (2019)	10	11	26	17	8
Environmental Performance rank (2020)	1	7	17	9	8
Good Country rank (2022)	2	5	20	11	1
Global Gender Gap Report rank (2022)	31	2	1	3	5
World's Mothers report rank (2014)	6	1	4	2	3
World Happiness Report rank (2023)	2	1	3	7	6
The figures in this table do not include the Faroe Islands, Greenland, Åland, Jan Mayen, Svalbard, Bouvet Island, Peter I Island, and Queen Maud Land.

=== Associated territories and other areas ===
Territory / Area	Faroe Islands	Greenland	Åland	Svalbard
Flag	Faroe Islands	Greenland	Åland	Svalbard
Coat of arms	Faroe Islands	Greenland	Åland	Norway
Official local name	Føroyar; Færøerne	Kalaallit Nunaat; Grønland	Landskapet Åland	Svalbard
Population (2016 estimate)	49,188	56,483	29,013	2,667
Area	1,393 km^{2}	2,166,086 km^{2}	1,580 km^{2}	61,022 km^{2}
Population density	35.5/km^{2}	0.028/km^{2}	18.36/km^{2}	0.044/km^{2}
Capital city	Tórshavn	Nuuk	Mariehamn	Longyearbyen
Largest urban areas	Tórshavn – 12,648; Klaksvík – 4,681; Hoyvík – 2,951; Argir – 1,907; Fuglafjørður – 1,542	Nuuk – 16,464; Sisimiut – 5,598; Ilulissat – 4,541; Qaqortoq – 3,229; Aasiaat – 3,142	Mariehamn – 11,521; Jomala – 4,646; Finström – 2,529; Lemland – 1,991; Saltvik – 1,827	Longyearbyen – 2,144; Barentsburg – 471; Ny-Ålesund – ~30–130; Isbjørnhamna – ~10–12
Sovereign state	Kingdom of Denmark		Republic of Finland	Kingdom of Norway
Status	Autonomous territory		Autonomous region	Unincorporated area
Form of government	Devolved parliamentary within a constitutional monarchy	Devolved parliamentary within a constitutional monarchy	Unitary parliamentary republic	Unitary parliamentary constitutional monarchy
Current head of state and government	Frederik X (King); Aksel V. Johannesen (Premier)	Frederik X (King); Múte Bourup Egede (Premier)	Alexander Stubb (President); Katrin Sjögren (Lantråd)	Harald V (King); Jonas Gahr Støre (Prime Minister)
European Union	No	No, OCT	Yes	No
European Economic Area	No	No	Yes	No
Nordic Council	Associate member	Associate member	Associate member	No individual representation
Main languages	Faroese, Danish	Greenlandic, Danish	Swedish	Norwegian
Main religions	89.3% Lutheran; 6% unspecified 3.8% none	96.08% Lutheran; 0.79% Inuit spiritual beliefs 2.48% atheist+agnostic	72.0% Lutheran; 1.3% Other religion 26.7% No religion	
GDP (nominal)	$2.77 billion	$2.22 billion		
GDP (nominal) per capita	$50,300	$43,365		
GDP (PPP)	$1.471 billion	$2.173 billion	$1.563 billion	
GDP (PPP) per capita	$36,600	$37,900	$55,829	
Real GDP growth rate	5.90% (2017 est.)	7.70% (2016 est.)		
Currency	Faroese króna Danish krone	Danish krone	Euro	Norwegian krone

== History ==
=== Timeline ===
Nordic political entities
Century	Danes	Greenlanders	Faroese	Icelanders	Norwegians	Swedes	Finns
8th	Prehistoric Danish (East-Norse)	Prehistoric Greenlandic (Paleo-Eskimo and West-Norse)	Prehistoric Faroese (West-Norse)	Prehistoric Icelandic (West-Norse)	Prehistoric Norwegian (West-Norse)	Prehistoric Swedish (East-Norse)	Prehistoric Finnish (Finnic)
9th	Prehistoric Danish (East-Norse)	Prehistoric Greenlandic (Paleo-Eskimo and West-Norse)	Prehistoric Faroese (West-Norse)	Prehistoric Icelandic (West-Norse)	Kingdom of Norway	Prehistoric Swedish (East-Norse)	Prehistoric Finnish (Finnic)
10th	Kingdom of Denmark	Prehistoric Greenlandic (Paleo-Eskimo and West-Norse)	Prehistoric Faroese (West-Norse)	Icelandic Commonwealth	Kingdom of Norway	Prehistoric Swedish (East-Norse)	Prehistoric Finnish (Finnic)
11th	Kingdom of Denmark	Prehistoric Greenlandic (Paleo-Eskimo and West-Norse)		Icelandic Commonwealth	Kingdom of Norway	Kingdom of Sweden	Prehistoric Finnish (Finnic)
12th	Kingdom of Denmark	Prehistoric Greenlandic (Paleo-Eskimo and West-Norse)		Icelandic Commonwealth	Kingdom of Norway	Kingdom of Sweden	Prehistoric Finnish (Finnic)
13th	Kingdom of Denmark				Kingdom of Norway	Kingdom of Sweden	
14th	Kingdom of Denmark				Kingdom of Norway	Kingdom of Sweden	
15th	Kalmar Union						
16th	Denmark-Norway					Sweden	
17th	Denmark-Norway					Sweden	
18th	Denmark-Norway					Sweden	
19th	Denmark				United Kingdoms of Sweden and Norway		Grand Duchy of Finland
20th	Denmark	Greenland	Faroe Islands	Iceland	Norway	Sweden	Finland
21st	Denmark	Greenland	Faroe Islands	Iceland	Norway	Sweden	Finland

Italics indicates a dependent territory.

=== Early history and Middle Ages ===
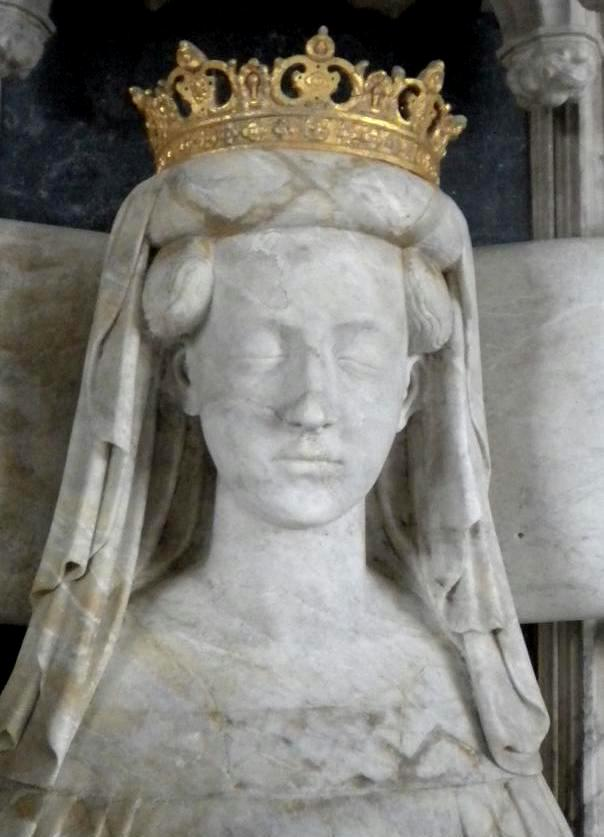
Effigy of Queen Margaret, founder and ruler of the Kalmar Union

Kalmar Union, c. 1400

Little evidence remains in the Nordic countries of the Stone Age, the Bronze Age, or the Iron Age with the exception of a limited numbers of tools created from stone, bronze and iron, some jewelry and ornaments and stone burial cairns. However, one important collection that exists is a widespread and rich collection of stone drawings known as petroglyphs. The Goths, who originated in southern Scandinavia and would later divide into Visigoths and Ostrogoths, are known to have been one of the Germanic people that would later relate to the fall of the Western Roman Empire and the emergence of Medieval Europe. However, these acquired the Latin culture of Rome.

The Nordic countries first came into more permanent contact with the rest of Europe during the Viking Age. Southern Finland and northern parts of Sweden and Norway were areas where the Vikings mostly only traded and had raids, whilst the permanent settlements of Vikings in the Nordic region were in southern Norway and Sweden, Denmark and Faroes as well as parts of Iceland, Greenland and Estonia. Christian Europe responded to the raids and conquest of Vikings with intensive missionary work. The missionaries wanted the new territories to be ruled by Christian kings who would help to strengthen the church. After conversion to Christianity in the 11th century, three northern kingdoms emerged in the region: Denmark, Norway and Sweden. Iceland first became a commonwealth before it came under Norwegian rule in the early 13th century. There were several secular powers who aimed to bring Finland under their rule, but through the Second and Third Swedish Crusade in the latter part of 13th century and through the colonisation of some coastal areas of Finland with Christian Swedes, the Swedish rule over Finland was gradually established.

During the Middle Ages, increased trade meant that the Nordic countries became increasingly integrated into Europe and Nordic society became more Continental. The monarchies strengthened their positions in the 12th and 13th centuries through imposing taxes on peasants and a class of nobles also emerged. By the Late Middle Ages, the whole of the Nordic region was politically united in the loose Kalmar Union. In 1472, Orkney and Shetland were transferred out of the Union, from Denmark to Scotland, and while a Nordic influence remains on those archiplaegoes, they are not generally considered Nordic today. Diverging interests and especially Sweden's dissatisfaction over the Danish dominance gave rise to a conflict that hampered the union from the 1430s onward until its final dissolution in 1523. After the dissolution Denmark and Norway, including Iceland, formed a personal union of the two kingdoms called Denmark–Norway whilst the successful period of Vasa Kings began in Sweden and Finland. The Lutheran Reformation played a major role in the establishment of the early-modern states in Denmark–Norway and Sweden.

=== Early modern period and industrialisation ===
Sweden was very successful during the Thirty Years' War, while Denmark was a failure. Sweden saw an opportunity of a change of power in the region. Denmark–Norway had a threatening territory surrounding Sweden and the Sound Dues were a continuing irritation for the Swedes. In 1643, the Swedish Privy Council determined Swedish territorial gain in an eventual war against Denmark–Norway to have good chances. Not long after this, Sweden invaded Denmark–Norway.

The war ended as foreseen with Swedish victory and with the Treaty of Brömsebro in 1645 Denmark–Norway had to cede some of their territories, including Norwegian territories Jemtland, Herjedalen and Idre and Serna, as well as the Danish Baltic Sea islands of Gotland and Ösel. The Thirty Years' War thus began the rise of Sweden as a great power, while it marked the start of decline for the Danish.

To some extent in the 16th century and certainly in the 17th, the Nordic region played a major role in European politics at the highest level. The struggle for dominion over the Baltic Sea and its trading opportunities raged between Denmark–Norway and Sweden, which began to impact upon the neighbouring nations. Sweden prevailed in the long term and became a major European power as it extended its reach into coastal tracts in modern-day Russia, Estonia, Latvia, and – following the Thirty Years' War – also into Pomerania and other North German areas. Sweden also conquered vast areas from Denmark–Norway during the Northern Wars in the middle of the 17th century. Sweden also had several conflicts with Russia over Finland and other eastern areas of the country and after the Great Northern War (1700–1721) Sweden lost most of its territories outside the old Swedish border to Russia which then became the new major power in Northern Europe.

After the Napoleonic Wars (1803–1815), the political map of the Nordic countries altered again. In 1809, Finland, then under Swedish rule, was conquered by the Russian Empire in the Finnish War, after which Finland became the autonomous Grand Duchy of Finland. In turn, Sweden captured Norway from Denmark in 1814 in the Swedish–Norwegian War and started a Union between Sweden and Norway. Iceland, the Faroe Islands and Greenland, which had been re-colonised in the 18th century, became Danish. Population growth and industrialisation brought change to the Nordic countries during the 19th century and new social classes steered political systems towards democracy. International politics and nationalism also created the preconditions for the later independence of Norway in 1905, Finland in 1917 and Iceland in 1944.

=== Late modern period and contemporary era ===
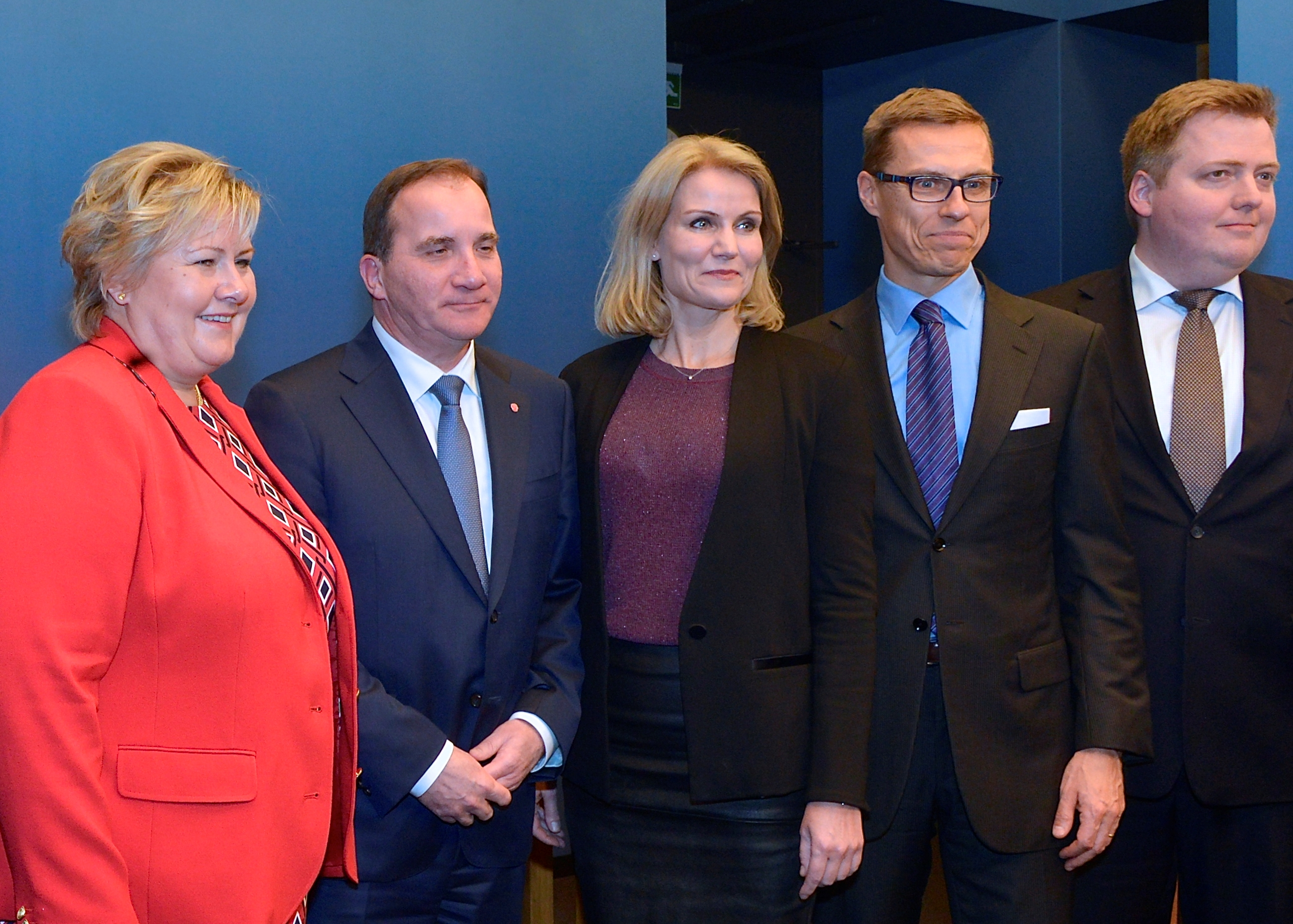
Nordic prime ministers at the Nordic Council meeting in 2014 in Stockholm

During the two world wars and the Cold War, the five small Nordic states were forced into difficult balancing acts, but retained their independence and developed peaceful democracies. The Nordic states had been neutral during World War I, but during World War II they could no longer stand apart from world politics. The Soviet Union attacked Finland in 1939 and Finland ceded territory following the Winter War. In 1941, Finland launched a retaliatory strike in conjunction with the German attack on the Soviet Union. However, more territory was lost and for many years to come Finnish foreign policy was based on appeasing the Soviet Union, even though Finland was able to retain its democratic form of government. Denmark and Norway were occupied by Germany in 1940. The Allies responded by occupying Iceland, the Faroe Islands and Greenland. Sweden managed to formally maintain its neutrality in the Axis/Allies conflict and avoided direct hostilities, but in practice it adapted to the wishes of the dominant power – first Germany, later the Allies. However, during the Winter War between Finland and Russia in 1939–1940, Sweden did support Finland and declared itself "non combatant" rather than neutral.

Compared with large parts of Europe, the Nordic region got off lightly during the World War II, which partially explains its strong post-war economic development. The labour movement – both trade unions and political parties – was an important political presence throughout the Nordic countries in the 20th century. The big social democratic parties became dominant and after World War II the Nordic countries began to serve as a model for the welfare state. Economically, the five Nordic countries were strongly dependent on foreign trade and so they positioned themselves alongside the big trading blocks. Denmark was the first to join European Economic Community (EEC) in 1972 and after it became European Union (EU) in 1993 Finland and Sweden also joined in 1995. Norway and Iceland are members of the European Free Trade Association (EFTA). All the Nordic countries are however members of the European Economic Area (EEA).

Following the dissolution of the Soviet Union in the 1990s, Nordic countries began partnerships with newly liberated neighbouring Baltic states (Estonia, Latvia and Lithuania) by opening Nordic council of ministers' offices in the three countries. The Baltic Assembly started to work together with the Nordic Council to form the Nordic-Baltic Eight in 1992, while big Baltic companies were bought by Nordic companies in sectors such as banking or telecommunications. In 1999, Estonia started to promote its Nordic heritage while the government of Sweden expressed regrets regarding the deportation of Estonian and Latvian soldiers to USSR in 1946. Following the Russian invasion of Ukraine, Finland joined NATO in 2023 as did Sweden a year later.

== Geography ==
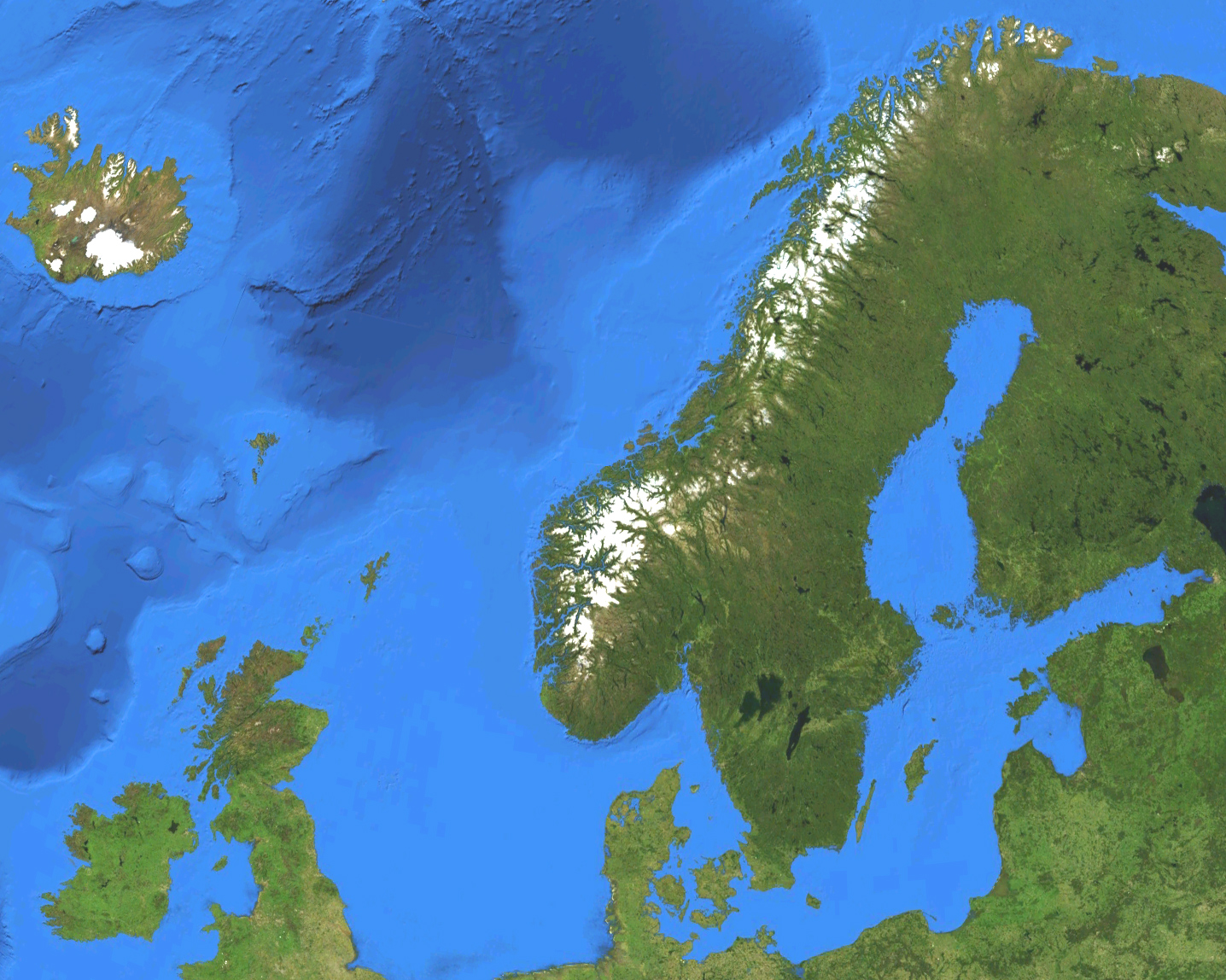
Satellite map of the European part of the Nordic countries, except for Jan Mayen and Svalbard

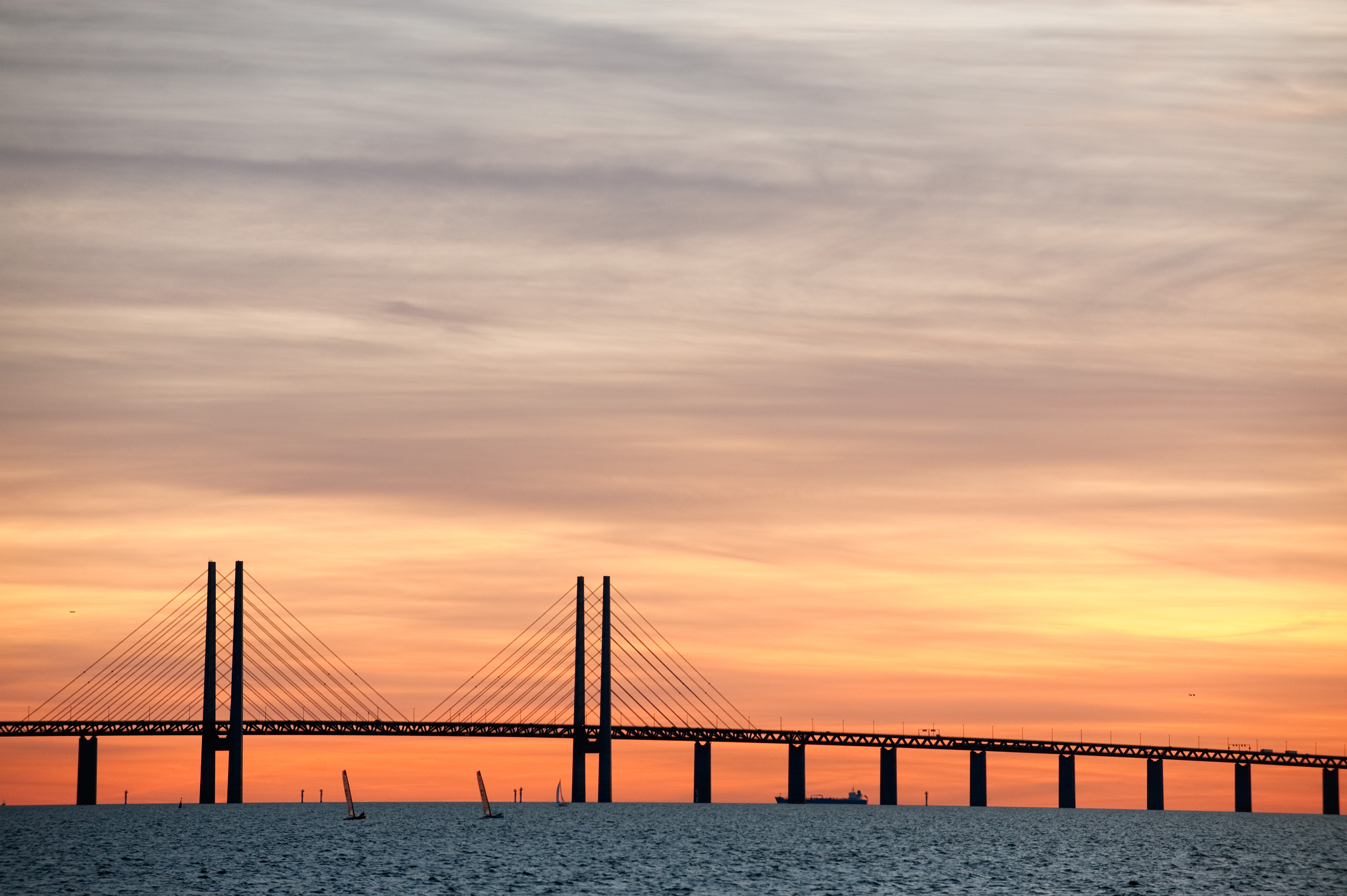
The Öresund Bridge between Malmö in Sweden and Copenhagen in Denmark

The Nordic countries and self-governing regions in alphabetic order – number of inhabitants (2018), area (km^{2}) and population density (people/km^{2}):

Country	Inhabitants	Area	Pop. density
Denmark	5,806,014	42,933	135
Faroe Islands	50,322	1,393	36
Finland	5,520,535	338,424	16
Iceland	355,620	102,775	3.5
Norway	5,323,933	385,203	14
Sweden	10,313,447	450,295	23
Åland	29,884	1,580	18
Total	27,301,531	1,322,603	21

Denmark is by far the most densely populated country, whilst Sweden, Norway and Finland are less densely populated and similar to each other from this perspective. Iceland has both the lowest population and by far the lowest population density. But large areas in Finland, Norway and Sweden, like most of Iceland, are unpopulated. There are no such areas in Denmark. Denmark has a population density around continental average, higher than for instance France and Poland but lower when compared to the United Kingdom, Italy or Germany. Finland, Norway and Sweden have a population density that is a little lower than the United States, but higher than Canada. In round figures, Iceland's population density resembles Canada's.

=== Land and water area ===
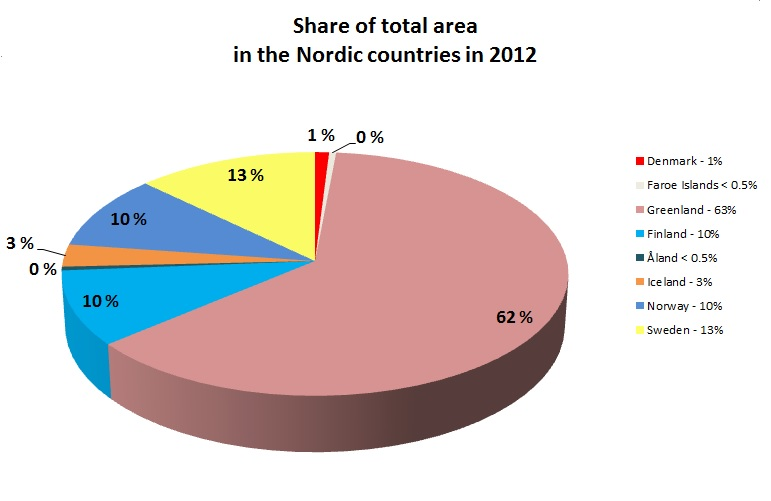
Share of total area in the Nordic countries in 2012

This list includes dependent territories within their sovereign states (including uninhabited territories), but does not include claims on Antarctica. EEZ+TIA is exclusive economic zone (EEZ) plus total internal area (TIA) which includes land and internal waters.

Rank	Country	Area	EEZ	Shelf	EEZ+TIA
1	Sweden	447,420	160,885	154,604	602,255
2	Norway	385,203	2,385,178	434,020	2,770,404
3	Finland	338,534	87,171	85,109	425,590
4	Iceland	103,440	751,345	108,015	854,345
5	Denmark (including Greenland)	2,210,579	2,551,238	495,657	4,761,811
Total (excluding Greenland)		1,318,158	3,751,563	-	5,064,065
Total		3,484,244	5,935,817	1,277,405	9,414,405

=== Denmark ===
The exclusive economic zones and territorial waters of the Kingdom of Denmark

The Kingdom of Denmark includes the home-rule (hjemmestyre) territory of the Faroe Islands and the self-rule (selvstyre) territory of Greenland.

Region	EEZ & TW Area (km^{2})	Land area	Total
Denmark	105 989	42 394	149 083
Faroe Islands	260 995	1 399	262 394
Greenland	2 184 254	2 166 086	4 350 340
Total	2 551 238	2 210 579	4 761 817

The Nordic countries have a combined area of around 3.5 million square kilometres and their geography is extremely varied. The area is so vast that it covers five time zones. To the east the region borders Russia, and on the west the Canadian coastline can be seen from Greenland on a clear day. Even excluding Greenland and the Norwegian islands of Svalbard and Jan Mayen, the remaining part of the Nordic countries covers around 1.3 million square kilometres. This is about the same area as France, Germany and Italy together. To the south, the countries neighbor the Baltic states, Poland, Germany and the United Kingdom, while to the north there is the Arctic Ocean.

Notable natural features of the Nordic countries include the Norwegian fjords, the Archipelago Sea between Finland and Sweden, the extensive volcanic and geothermal activity of Iceland, and Greenland, which is the largest island in the world. The southernmost point of the Nordic countries is Gedser, on the island of Falster in Denmark. The northernmost point is Kaffeklubben Island in Greenland, which is also the northernmost point of land on Earth. The largest cities and capitals of the Nordic countries are situated on the southern parts of the region, with the exception of Reykjavík, the capital of Iceland. Helsinki, Oslo and Stockholm are all close to the same latitude as the southernmost point of Greenland, Egger Island (Itilleq): about 60°N.

=== Topography ===
All of Denmark and most of Finland lie below 200 m and the topography of both is relatively flat. In Denmark, moraines and tunnel valleys add some relief to the landscape while in Finland the surroundings of lakes Pielinen and Päijänne display some moderate relief. The Finnish area just east of Bothnian Bay stands out as the largest plain in the Nordic countries. The Scandinavian Mountains dominate the landscape of Norway. The southern part of the Scandinavian Mountains is broader than the northern one and contains higher peaks. The southern part contains also a series of plateaux and gently undulating plains. The western parts of the mountains are cut by fjords, producing a dramatic landscape. The landscape of Sweden can be described as a mixture of that of Norway, Finland and Denmark. Except at the High Coast the coastal areas of Sweden form lowlands. Sweden has three highland areas, the South Swedish Highlands, the Scandinavian Mountains and the Norrland terrain which is the eastern continuation of the Scandinavian Mountains. The South Swedish Highland and the Norrland terrain are separated by the Central Swedish lowland. The topography of Iceland stands out among the Nordic countries for being a bowl-formed highland.

=== Climate ===
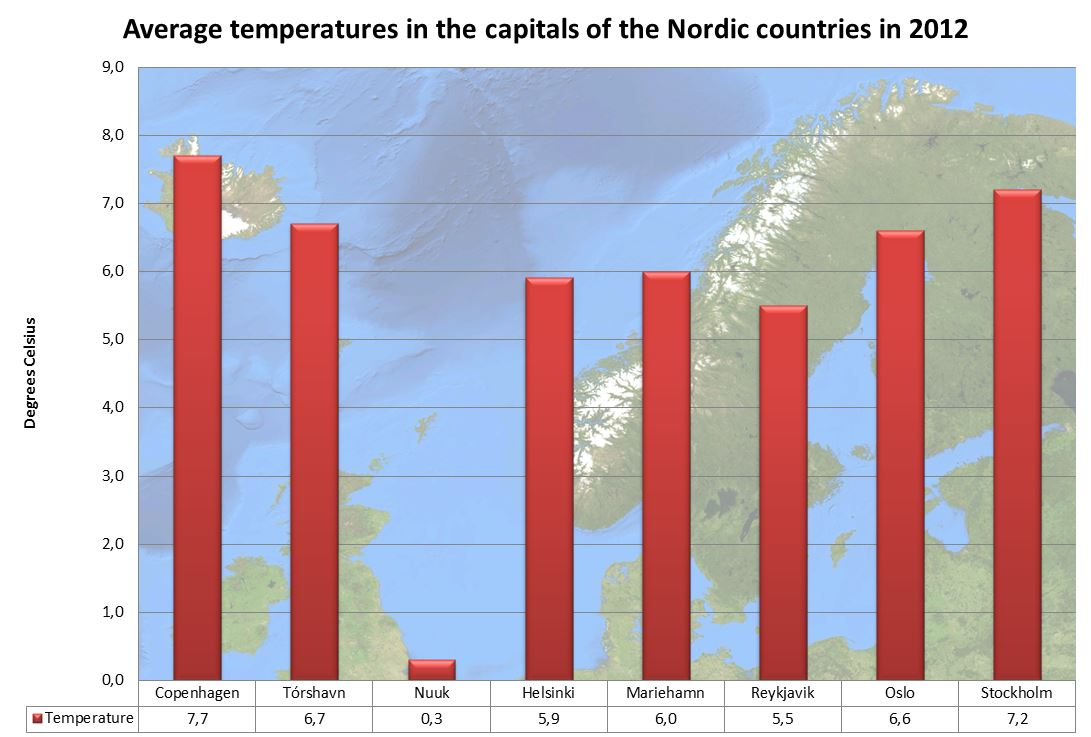
Average temperatures in the capitals of the Nordic countries in 2012

Despite their northern location, the Nordic countries generally have a mild climate compared with other countries that share globally the same latitudes. The climate in the Nordic countries is mainly influenced by their northern location, but remedied by the vicinity to the ocean and the Gulf Stream which brings warm ocean currents from the tip of Florida. Even far to the north, the winters can be quite mild, though north of the Polar Circle the climate zone is mostly subarctic with harsh winters and short summers. In Greenland and Svalbard the climate is polar. The sea has a heavy influence on the weather in the western coastal zones of Iceland, Norway, Denmark and Sweden. The precipitation is high and snow cover during winters is rare. Summers are generally cool.

The further away that one gets from the Atlantic Ocean and the Gulf Stream the colder it gets during the winters. Finland, most of Sweden and the south-eastern part of Norway are influenced by the vast continent to the east which results in warm and long summers and clear and cold winters, often with snow. For example, Bergen at the west coast of Norway normally has a temperature above zero in February while Helsinki in Finland normally will have a temperature of 7–8 °C below zero during the same month.

Climatic conditions and quality of land have determined how land is used in the Nordic countries. In densely populated mainland Denmark there is hardly any wild nature left. Most of the scarce forests are plantations and nearly 60 per cent of Denmark's total area is cultivated or zoned as gardens or parks. On the other hand, in the other Nordic countries there is much wild nature left. Only between 0 and 9 per cent of the land in the other Nordic countries is cultivated. Around 17 per cent of the land area in Iceland is used for permanent meadows and pastures and both Finland, Norway as well as Sweden have large forest areas.

== Politics ==
=== Political dimension and divisions ===
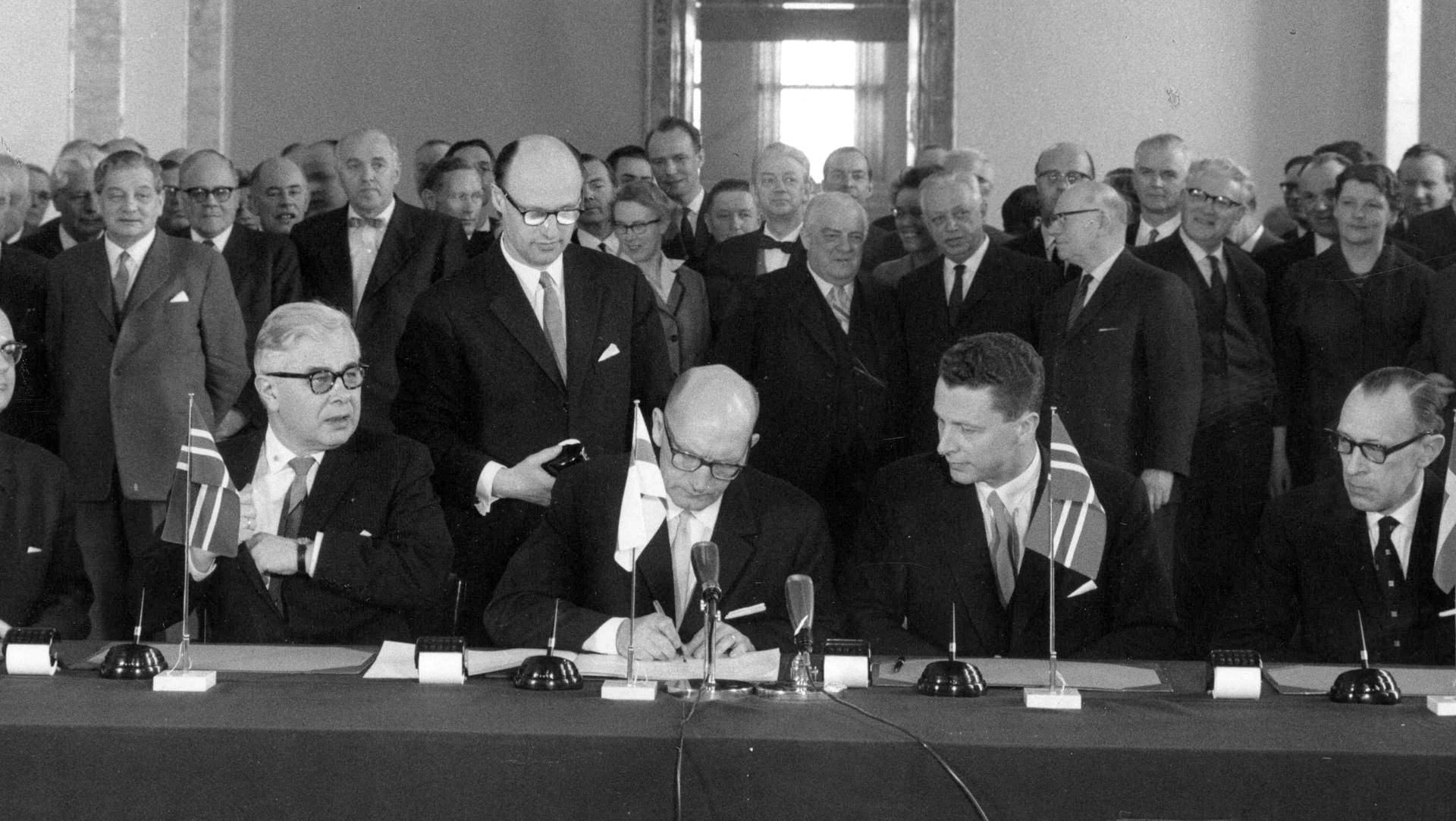
Signing the Helsinki Treaty in 1962

The Nordic region has a political dimension in the joint official bodies called the Nordic Council and the Nordic Council of Ministers. The Helsinki Treaty, signed on 23 March 1962 entered into force on 1 July 1962 and is the political agreement which sets the framework for Nordic cooperation. 23 March is celebrated as the "Nordic Day" as the treaty is sometimes referred to as the constitution of the Nordic cooperation.

Several aspects of the common market as in the EU have been implemented decades before the EU implemented them. Intra-Nordic trade is not covered by the United Nations Convention on Contracts for the International Sale of Goods (CISG), but by local law. The Nordic countries have cooperated closely in the administrative and consular fields since the Nordic Passport Union was established and the Helsinki Treaty concluded. According to the Helsinki Treaty, public officials in the foreign services of any of the Nordic countries are to assist citizens of another Nordic country if that country is not represented in the territory concerned.

=== Nordic Council and Nordic Council of Ministers ===
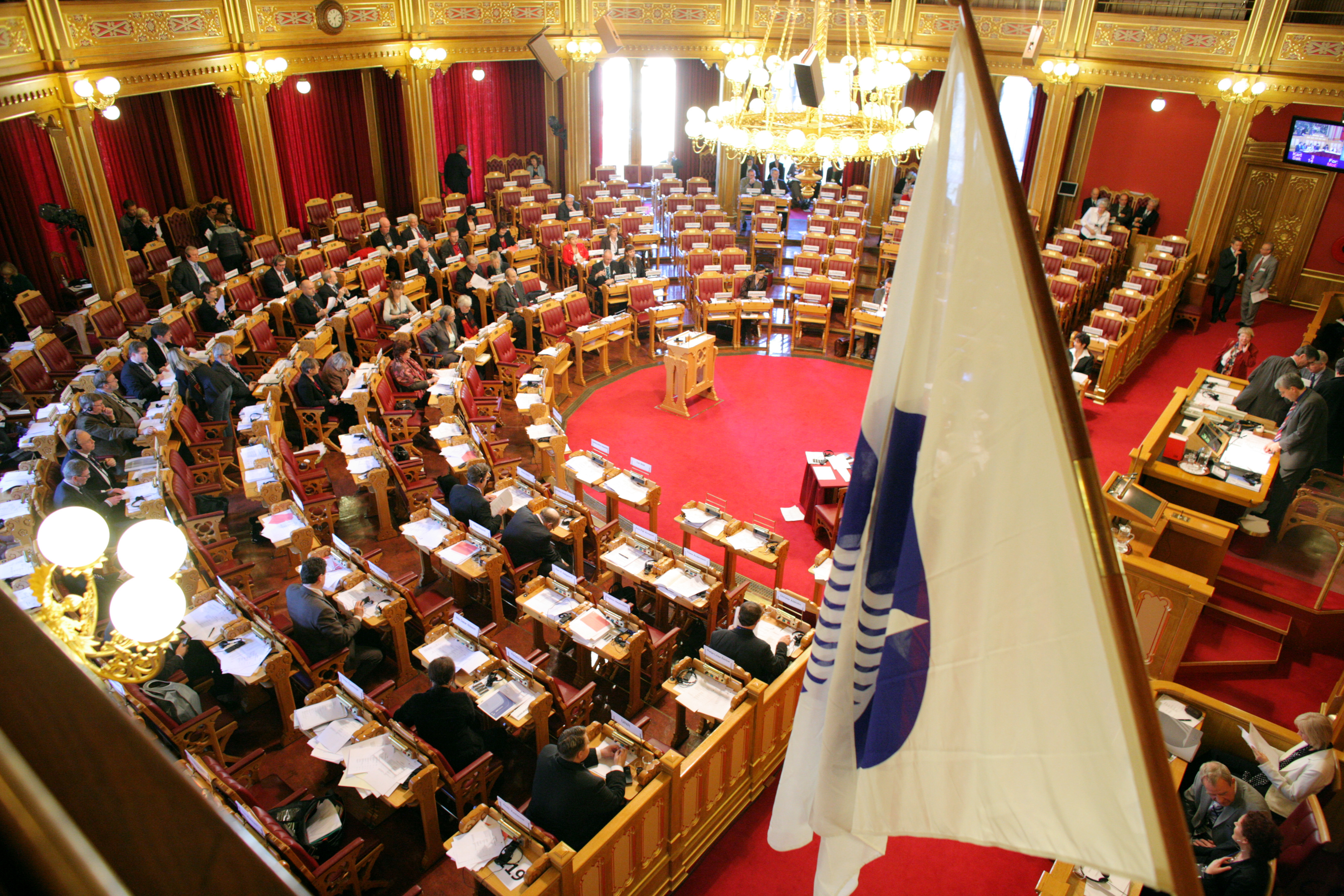
Nordic Council in session at the Parliament of Norway in 2007

Nordic cooperation is based on the Helsinki Treaty. Politically, Nordic countries do not form a separate entity, but they cooperate in the Nordic Council and the Nordic Council of Ministers. The council was established after World War II and its first concrete result was the introduction of a Nordic Passport Union in 1952. This resulted in a common labour market and free movement across borders without passports for the countries' citizens. In 1971, the Nordic Council of Ministers, an intergovernmental forum, was established to complement the council. The Nordic Council and the Council of Ministers have their headquarters in Copenhagen and various installations in each separate country, as well as many offices in neighbouring countries. The headquarters are located at Ved Stranden No. 18, close to Slotsholmen.

The Nordic Council consists of 87 representatives, elected from its members' parliaments and reflecting the relative representation of the political parties in those parliaments. It holds its main session in the autumn, while a so-called "theme session" is arranged in the spring. Each of the national delegations has its own secretariat in the national parliament. The autonomous territories – Greenland, the Faroe Islands and Åland – also have Nordic secretariats. The Council does not have any formal power on its own, but each government has to implement any decisions through its country's legislative assembly. All of the Nordic countries are members of NATO. The Nordic foreign and security policy cooperation became closer and expanded its scope in 2014.

The Nordic Council of Ministers is responsible for inter-governmental cooperation. Prime ministers have ultimate responsibility, but this is usually delegated to the Minister for Nordic Cooperation and the Nordic Committee for Co-operation, which coordinates the day-to-day work. The autonomous territories have the same representation as states.

=== Nordic model ===
Vote percentage over time of the main social democratic parties in Denmark, Finland, Sweden and Norway: Swedish Social Democratic Party Labour Party (Norway) Social Democrats (Denmark) Social Democratic Party of Finland

The Nordic countries share an economic and social model, which involves the combination of a market economy with a welfare state financed with heavy taxes. The welfare states were largely developed by strong social democrat parties and in Finland with cooperation with the Agrarian League. Although the specifics differ between countries and there are ongoing political arguments, there is a strong consensus about keeping to the general concept.

A central theme in the Nordic model is the "universalist" welfare state aimed specifically at enhancing individual autonomy, promoting social mobility and ensuring the universal provision of basic human rights, as well as for stabilising the economy. In this model welfare is not just aid to those who are in need of it, but a central part of the life of everybody: education is free, healthcare has zero or nominal fees in most cases, most children go to municipal day care, etc.

The Nordic model is distinguished from other types of welfare states by its emphasis on maximising labour force participation, promoting gender equality, egalitarian and extensive benefit levels, the large magnitude of income redistribution and liberal use of expansionary fiscal policy. Trade unions are strong.

The model has been successful: the countries are among the wealthiest worldwide and there is little social unrest. In 2015, Save the Children ranked the Nordic countries as number 1–5 of countries where mothers and children fare the best (among 179 countries studied).

=== Elections ===
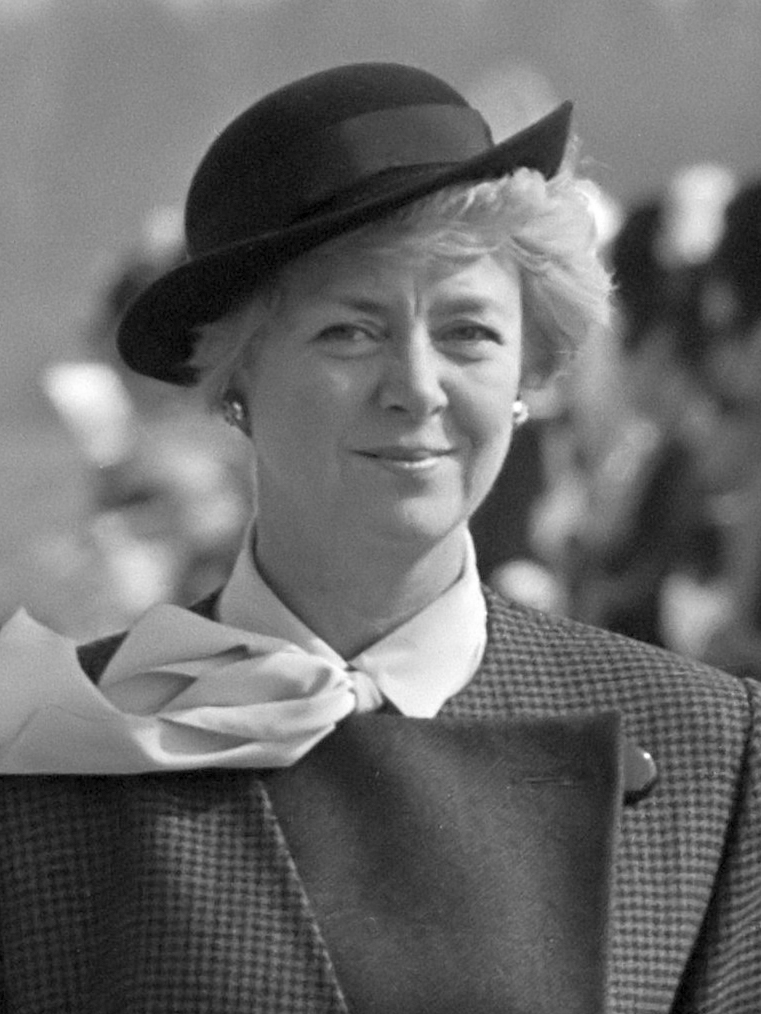
Vigdís Finnbogadóttir served as the fourth President of Iceland from 1980 to 1996 and was the world's first democratically elected female head of state.

Nordic parliaments are all based on a one-chamber system. The Norwegian parliament, the Storting, did actually function as two separate chambers until 2009 when dealing with certain issues. The Icelandic Althing, founded in 930 AD, is reputed to be the oldest working parliament in the world. However, it was dissolved for much of the first half of the 19th century. In Denmark, Iceland and Sweden elections are held at least once every four years. Finland, Åland and Norway have fixed four-year election periods. Elections in the Faroe Islands and Greenland follow the Danish system of elections. The Danish Folketing has 179 seats, including two seats each for the Faroe Islands and Greenland. The Finnish Eduskunta has 200 seats, including one seat for Åland. The Icelandic Althing has 63 seats, the Norwegian Storting 169 seats and the Swedish Riksdag 349 seats. The Faroese Løgting has 33 seats, Greenland's Inatsisartut 31 seats and Åland's Lagtinget 30 seats.

Nordic citizens – and in the three member countries of the EU also EU citizens – living in another Nordic country are normally entitled to vote in local government elections after three months of residence, while other foreign citizens have to reside in the Nordic countries for three to four years before they are eligible to vote. In Denmark and the Faroe Islands, the percentage turn-out at elections is close to 90% per cent, but it is only about 67% in Åland and Finland. Men are more often elected to the national assembly compared to women. The biggest bias between the two sexes is seen in the Faroe Islands and Åland, while in Sweden men and women are close to being equally represented in the national assembly.

=== Nordic Passport Union ===
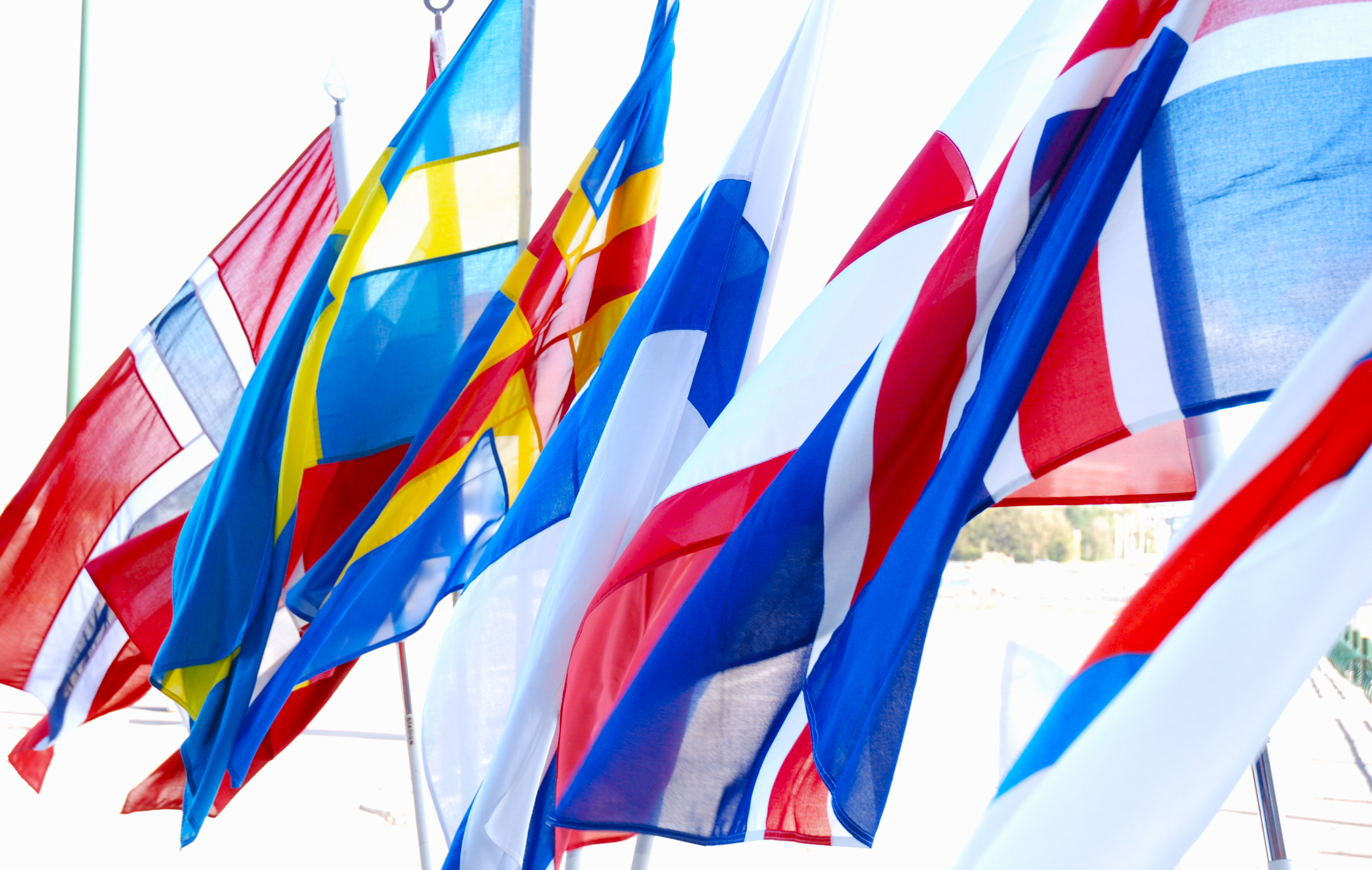
Nordic flags

The Nordic Passport Union, created in 1954 and implemented on 1 May 1958, allows citizens of the Nordic countries: Denmark (Faroe Islands included since 1 January 1966, Greenland not included), Sweden, Norway (Svalbard, Bouvet Island and Queen Maud Land not included), Finland and Iceland (since 24 September 1965) to cross approved border districts without carrying and having their passport checked. Other citizens can also travel between the Nordic countries' borders without having their passport checked, but still have to carry some sort of approved travel identification documents. During the 2015 European migrant crisis, temporary border controls were set up between Denmark and Sweden to control the movement of refugees into Sweden.

Since 1996, these countries have been part of the larger EU directive Schengen Agreement area, comprising 30 countries in Europe. Border checkpoints have been removed within the Schengen Area and only a national ID card is required. Within the Nordic area any means of proving one's identity, e.g. a driving licence, is valid for Nordic citizens because of the Nordic Passport Union. When traveling to other countries than the Nordics, public officials in the foreign services of any of the Nordic countries are to assist citizens of another Nordic country if that country is not represented in the territory concerned, according to the Helsinki Treaty.

Since 25 March 2001, the Schengen acquis has fully applied to the five countries of the Nordic Passport Union (except for the Faroe Islands). There are some areas in the Nordic Passport Union that give extra rights for Nordic citizens, not covered by Schengen, such as less paperwork if moving to a different Nordic country and fewer requirements for naturalisation.

=== European integration and international cooperation ===
Organisation	Denmark	Finland	Iceland	Norway	Sweden
CoE	Yes	Yes	Yes	Yes	Yes
Nordic Council	Yes	Yes	Yes	Yes	Yes
EU	Yes	Yes	No	No	Yes
EEA	Yes	Yes	Yes	Yes	Yes
EFTA	No	No	Yes	Yes	No
Eurozone	No	Yes	No	No	No
Schengen Area	Yes	Yes	Yes	Yes	Yes
NATO	Yes	Yes	Yes	Yes	Yes
OECD	Yes	Yes	Yes	Yes	Yes
UN	Yes	Yes	Yes	Yes	Yes
WTO	Yes	Yes	Yes	Yes	Yes

The political cooperation between the Nordic countries has not led to a common policy or an agreement on the countries' memberships in the EU and Eurozone. Norway and Iceland are the only Nordic countries not members of the EU – both countries are instead members of EFTA. Only Finland is a member of the Eurozone. The Nordics are however all part of the European Economic Area. The tasks and policies of the EU overlap with the Nordic Council significantly, e.g. the Schengen Agreement, Freedom of movement for workers in the European Union and Free Movement Directive partially supersedes the Nordic passport-free zone and the common Nordic labor market. The Schengen Area covers all the Nordic countries, excluding the Faroe Island and Svalbard.

Additionally, certain areas of Nordic countries have special relationships with the EU. For example, Finland's autonomous island province Åland is not a part of the EU VAT zone.

In the EU, the Northern Dimension refers to external and cross-border policies covering the Nordic countries, the Baltic countries and Russia.

There is no explicit provision in the Treaty on European Union or Treaty on the Functioning of the European Union that takes Nordic cooperation into account. However, the Treaties provide that international agreements concluded by the Member States before they become members of the Union remain valid, even if they are contrary to the provisions of Union law. Each Member State must nonetheless take all necessary measures to eliminate any discrepancies as quickly as possible. Nordic cooperation can therefore in practice only be designed to the extent that it complies with Union law. Sweden and Finland issued a joint declaration when they joined the EU: "The Contracting Parties notes that Sweden [...] and Finland, as members of the European Union, intend to continue their Nordic co-operation, both with each other and with other countries and territories, in full compliance with Community law and other provisions of the Maastricht Treaty".

Article 121 of the EEA-agreement states that "the provisions of the Agreement shall not preclude cooperation: (a) within the framework of the Nordic cooperation to the extent that such cooperation does not impair the good functioning of this Agreement".

By 2024, all Nordic countries had become members of NATO, with Finland joining on 4 April 2023 and Sweden joining on 7 March 2024.

=== Current leaders ===
All the Nordic countries are long-established parliamentary democracies. Denmark, Norway and Sweden have a political system of constitutional monarchy, in which a nonpolitical monarch acts as head of state and the de facto executive power is exercised by a cabinet led by a prime minister. Carl XVI Gustaf became King of Sweden on 15 September 1973, King Haakon VIII of Norway has reigned since 28 August 2026 and Frederik X became King of Denmark on 14 January 2024.

Finland and Iceland have been parliamentary republics since their independence. Both countries are led by prime ministers, whilst the directly elected president acts mostly as a ceremonial head of state with some legislative power. Finland had a long tradition of having a strong presidential system, since in the beginning of its independence Prince Frederick Charles of Hesse was elected to the throne of Finland and Finland was to become a monarchy. This failed due to World War I and the fall of the German Empire and so it was a compromise that Finland became a republic with a strong head of state. The President's powers were once so broad that it was said Finland was the only real monarchy in northern Europe. However, amendments passed in 1999 reduced his powers somewhat and the President now shares executive authority with the Prime Minister.

Heads of state

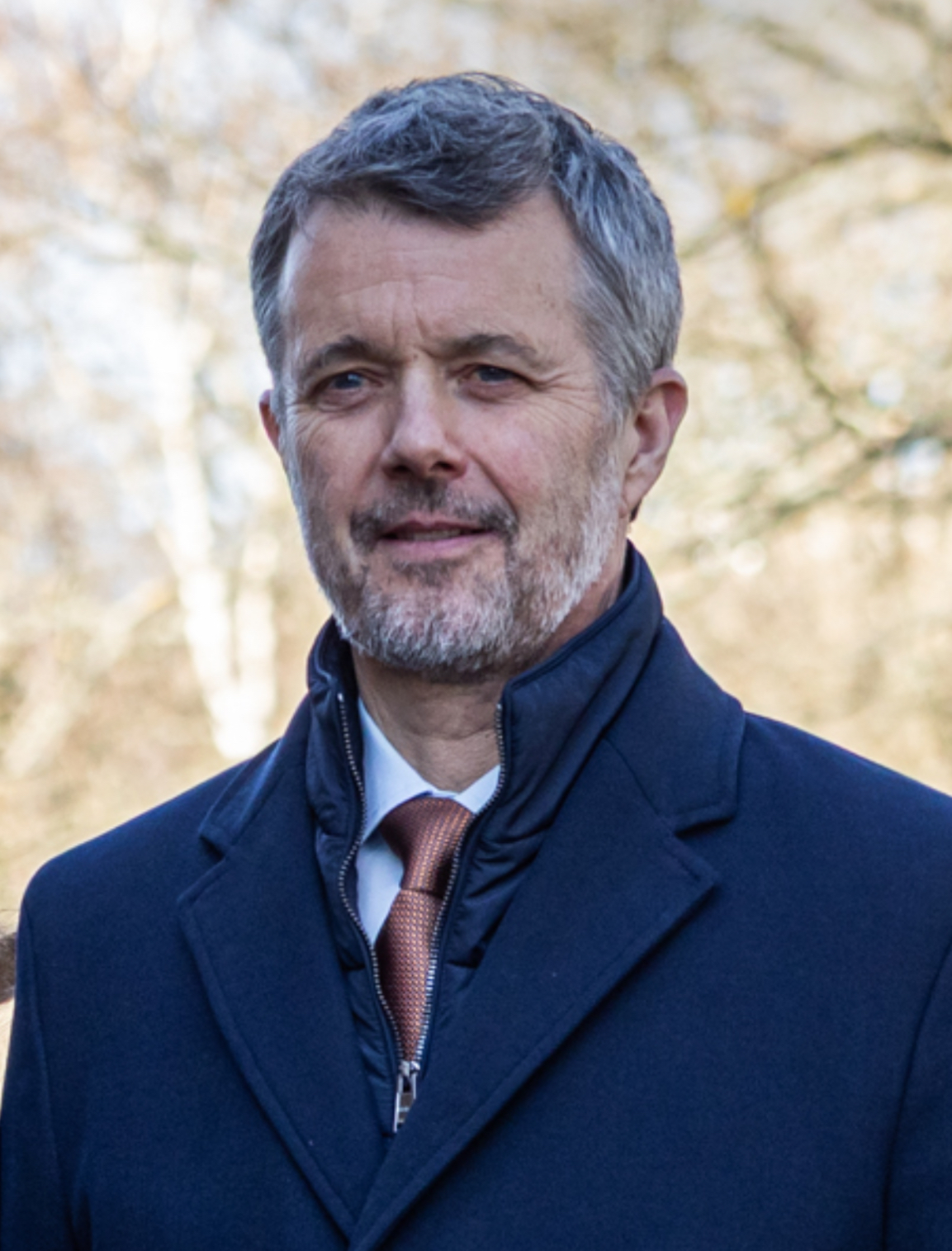
Denmark
Frederik X
King of Denmark
since 2024

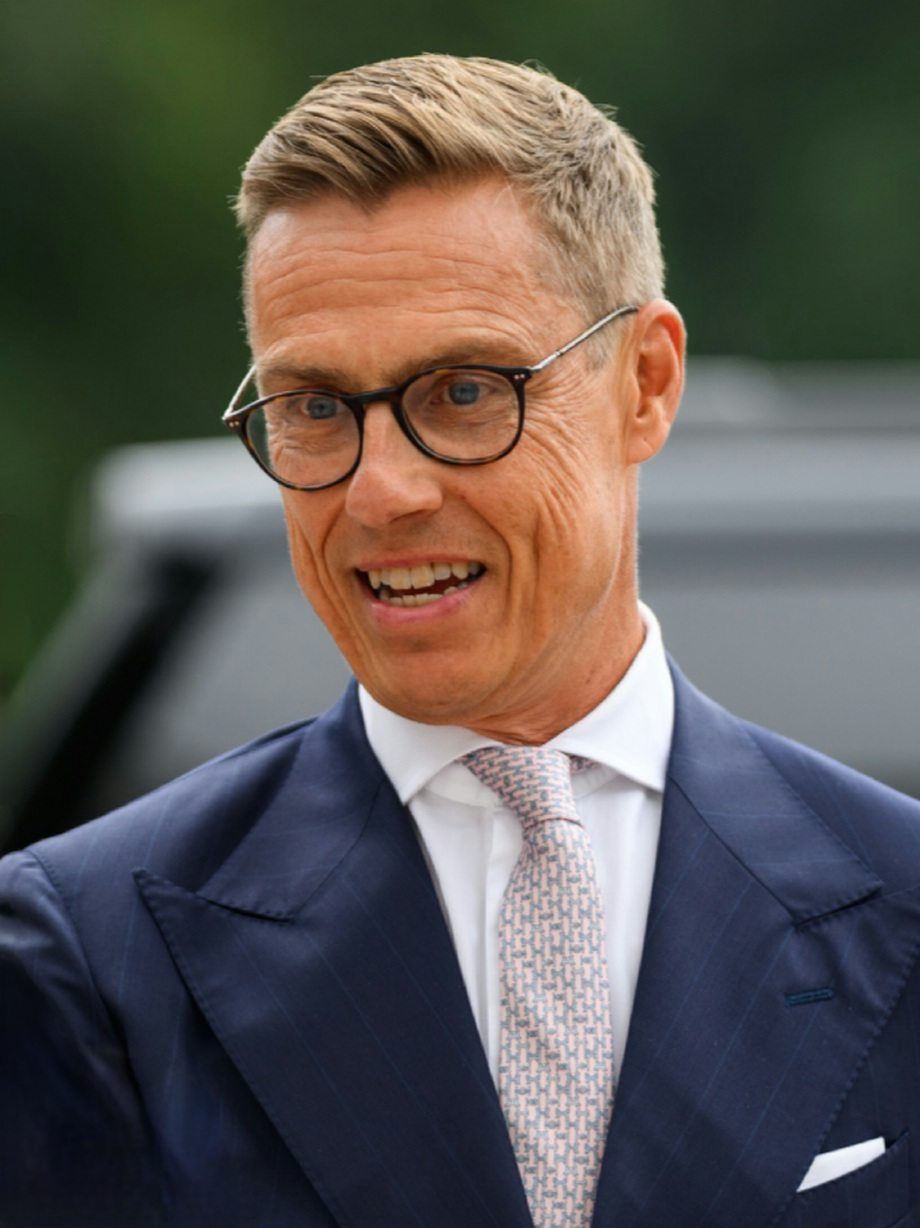
Finland
Alexander Stubb
President of Finland
since 2024 election

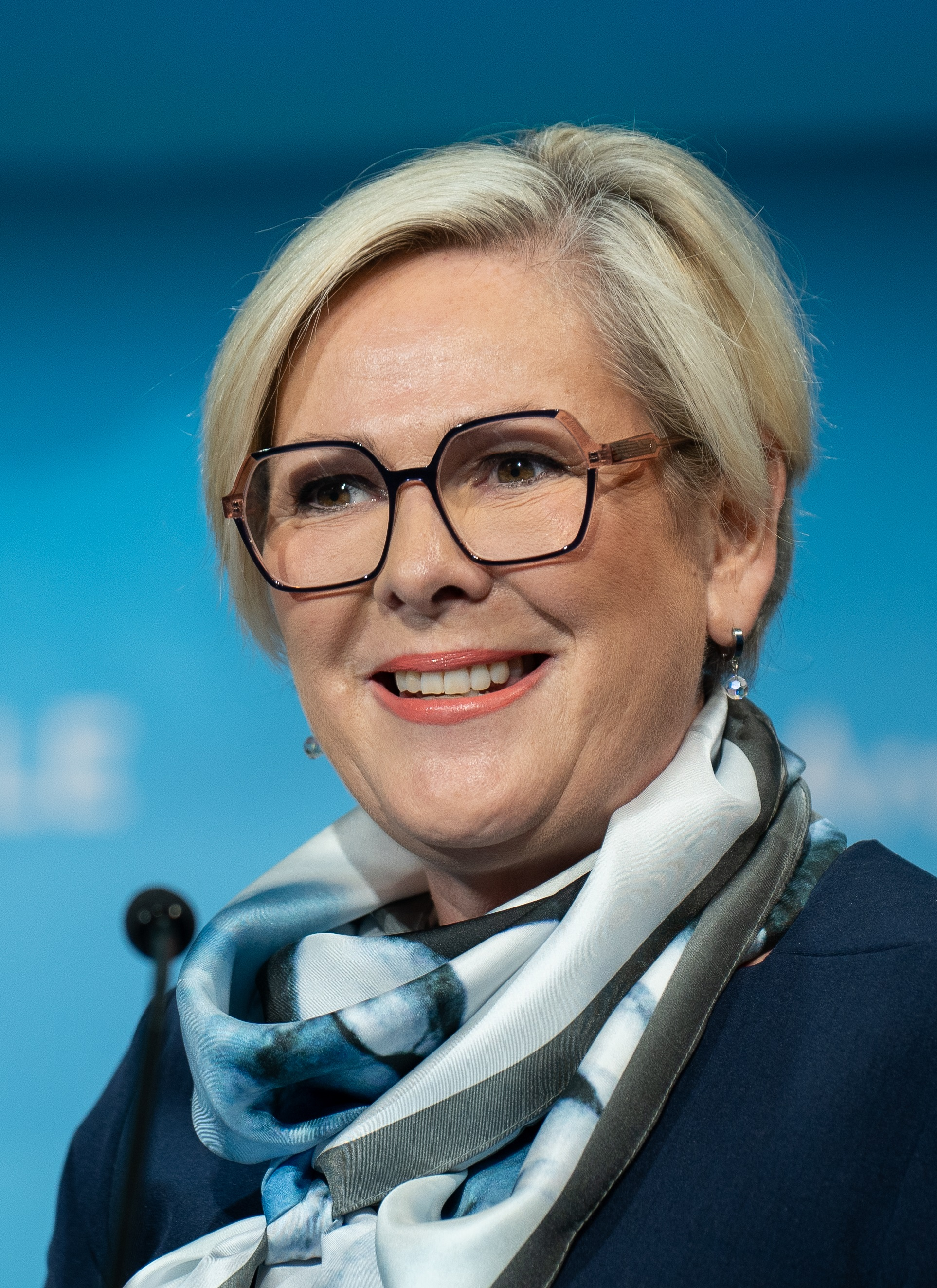
Iceland
Halla Tómasdóttir
President of Iceland
since 2024 election

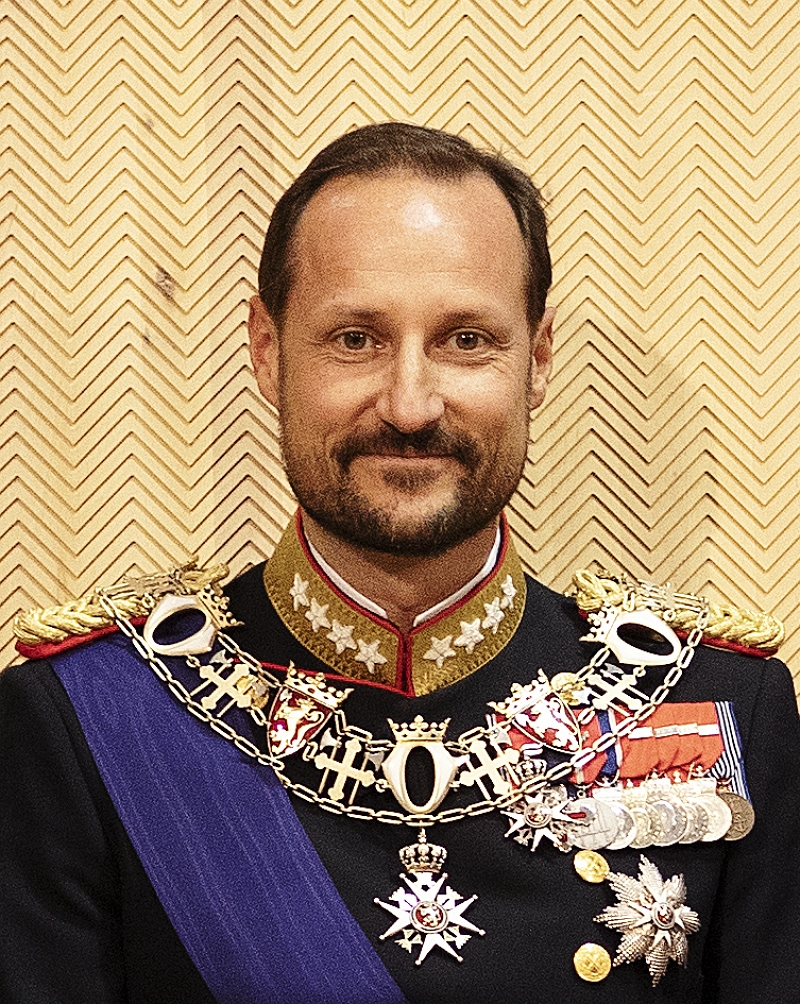
Norway
Haakon VIII
King of Norway
since 2026

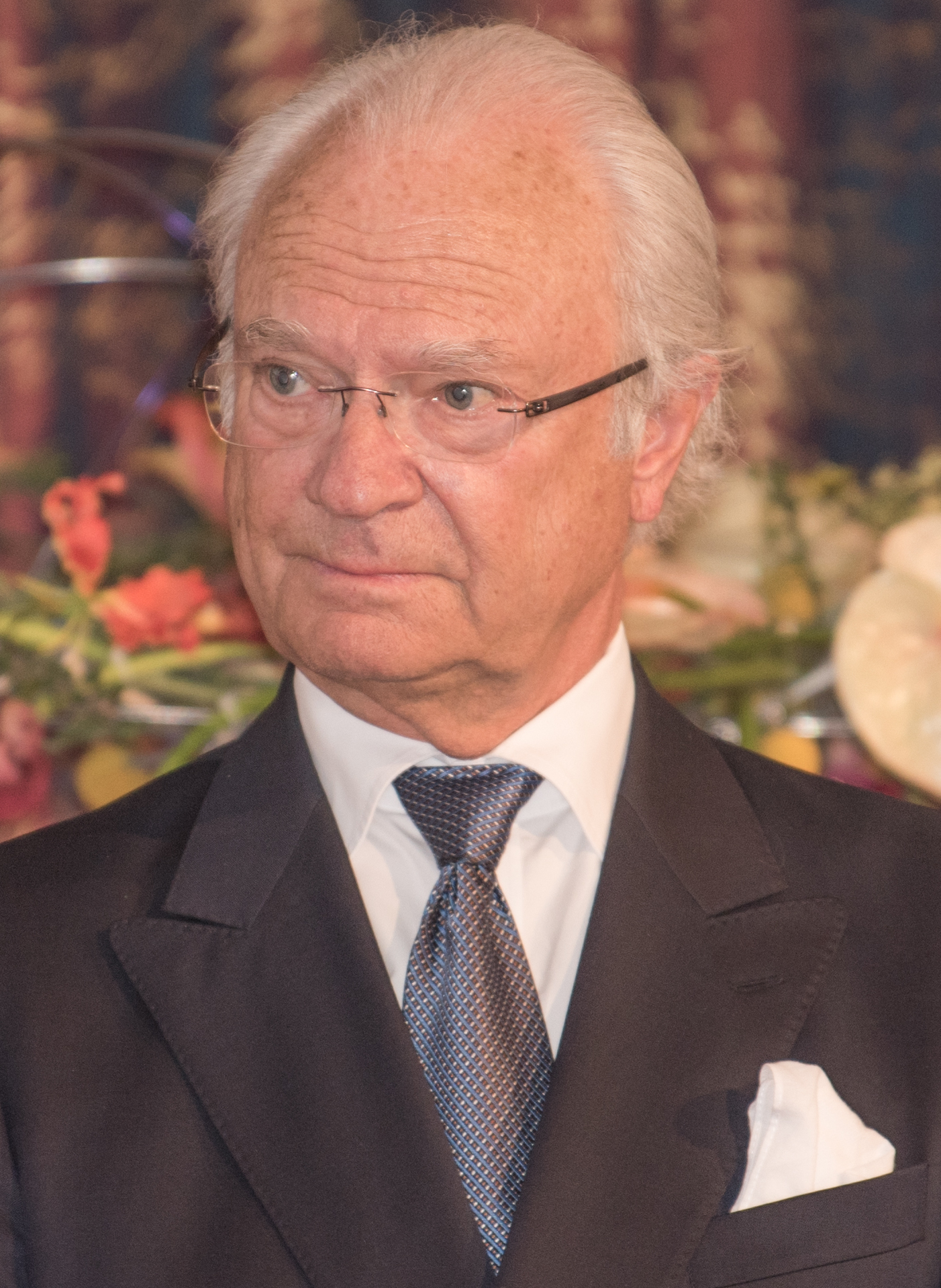
Sweden
Carl XVI Gustaf
King of Sweden
since 1973
Prime ministers

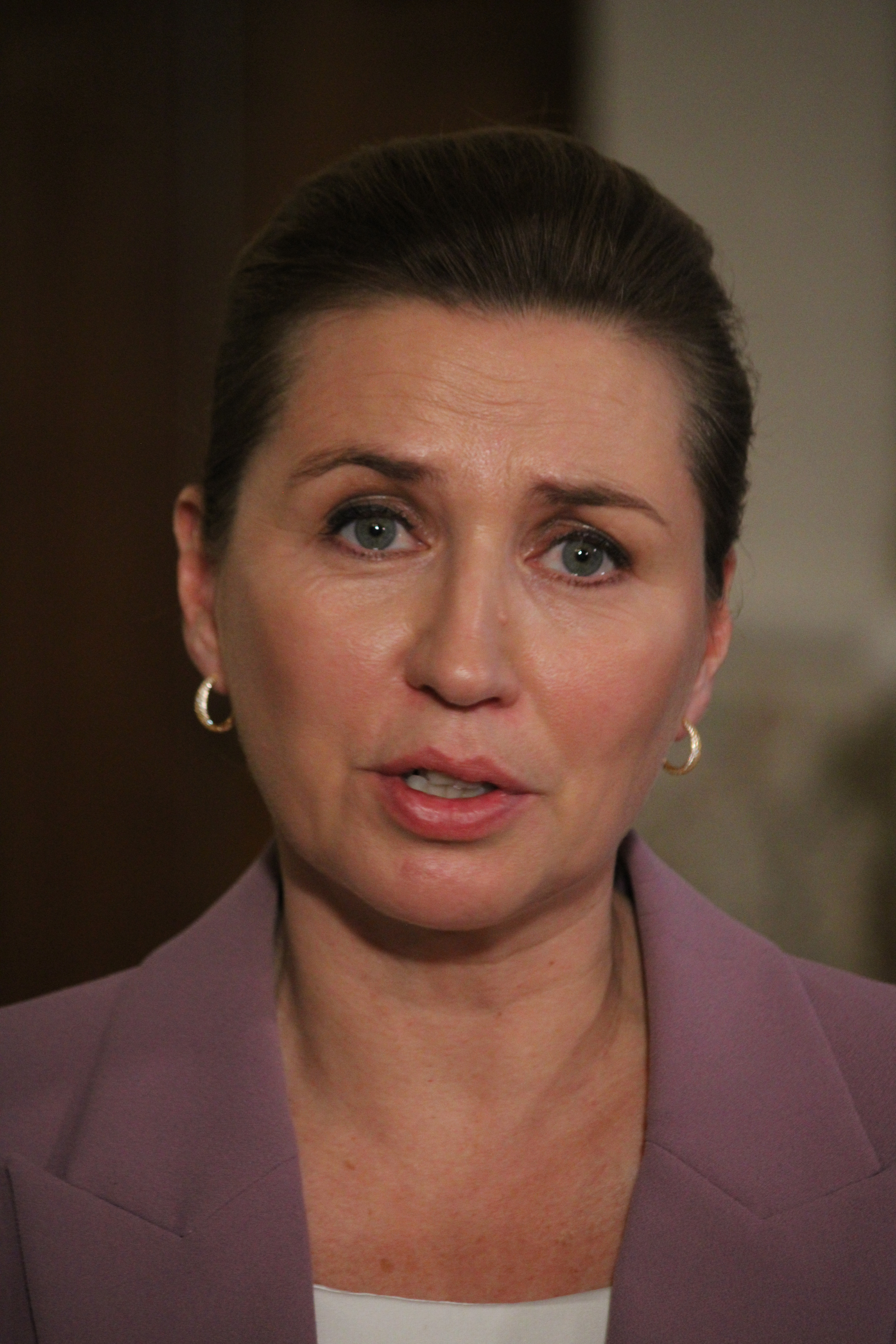
Denmark
Mette Frederiksen
Prime Minister of Denmark
since 2019 election
Frederiksen Cabinet

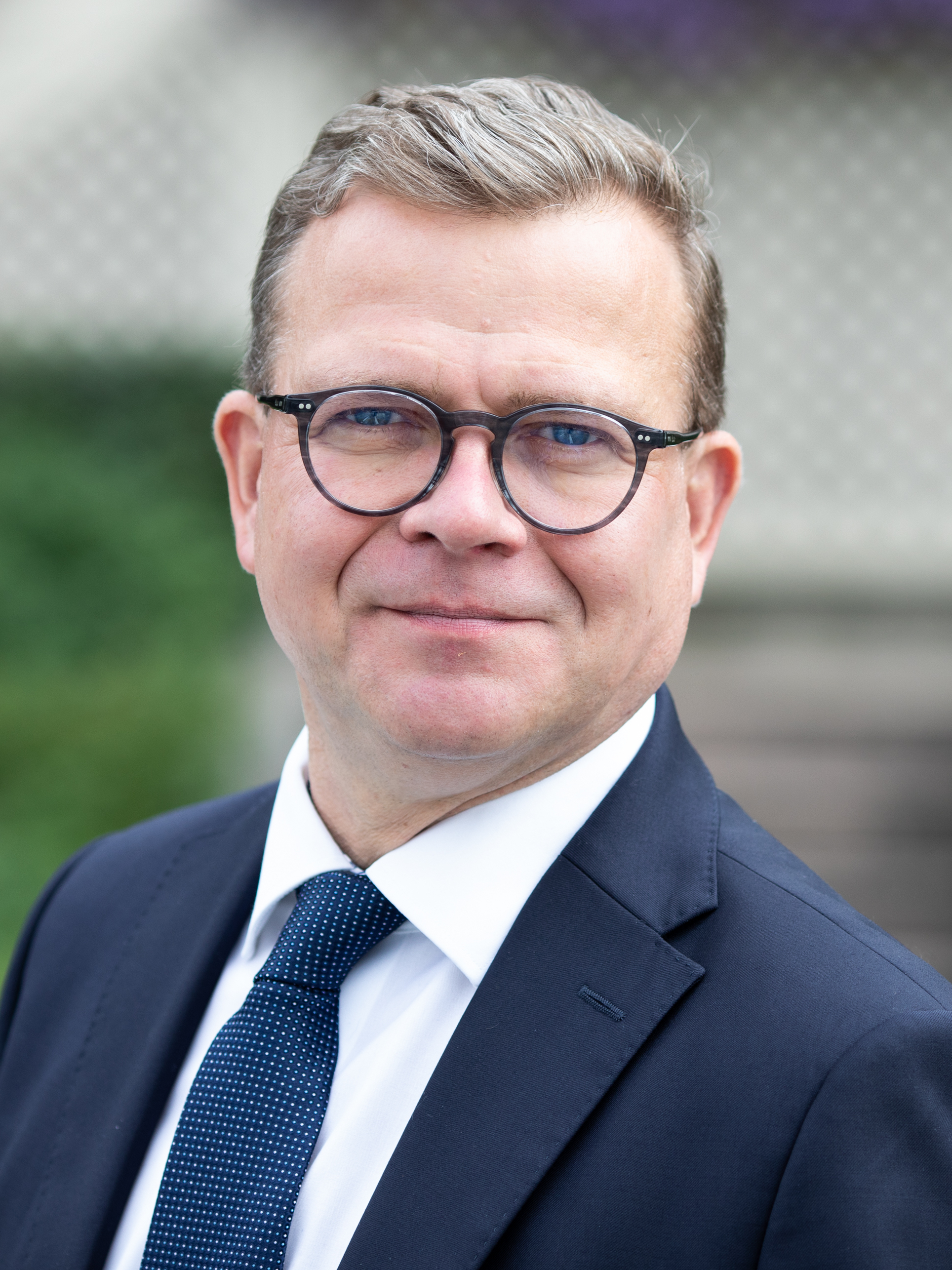
Finland
Petteri Orpo
Prime Minister of Finland
since 2023 election
Orpo Cabinet

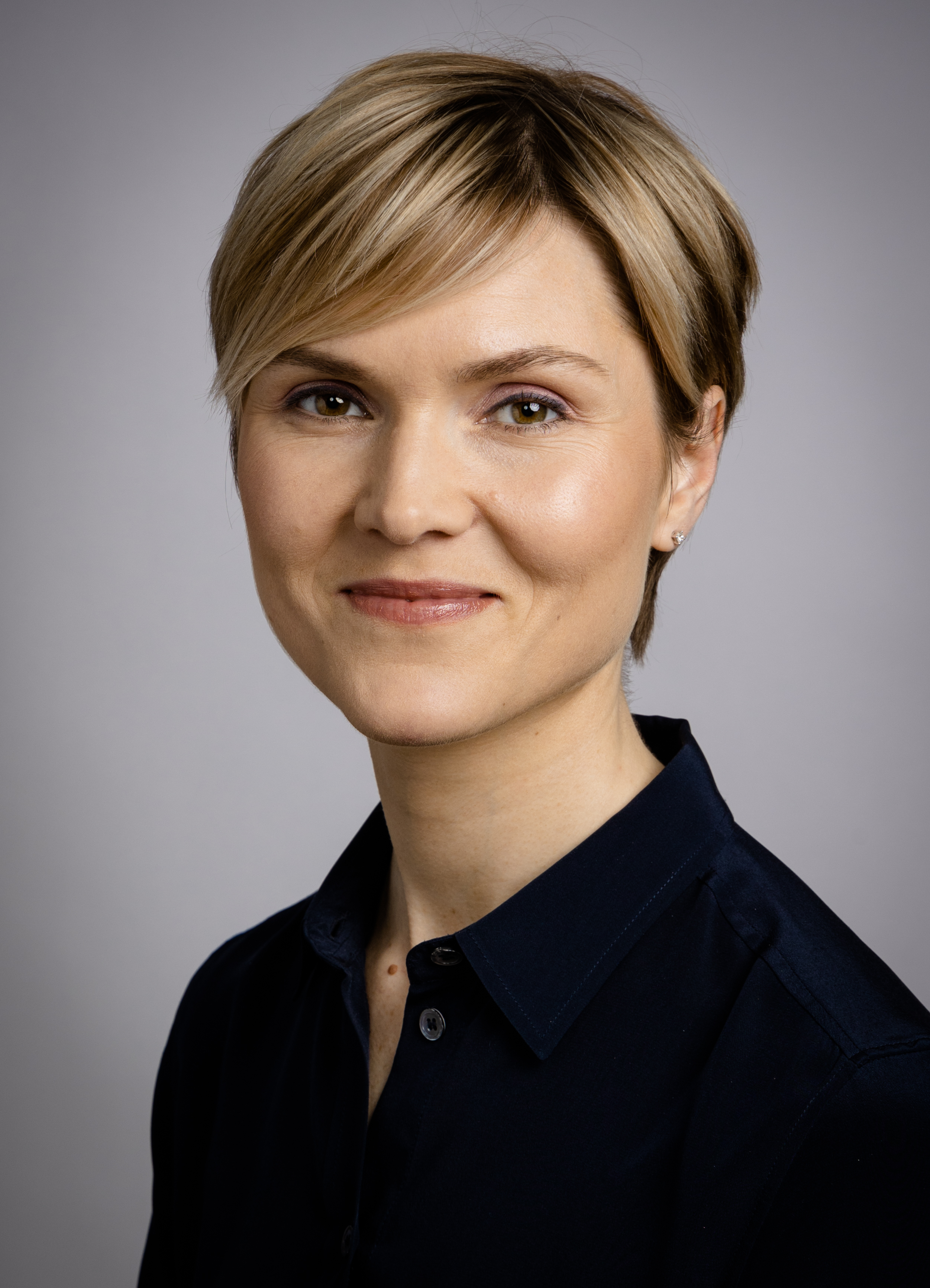
Iceland
Kristrún Frostadóttir
Prime Minister of Iceland
since 2024 election
Frostadóttir Cabinet

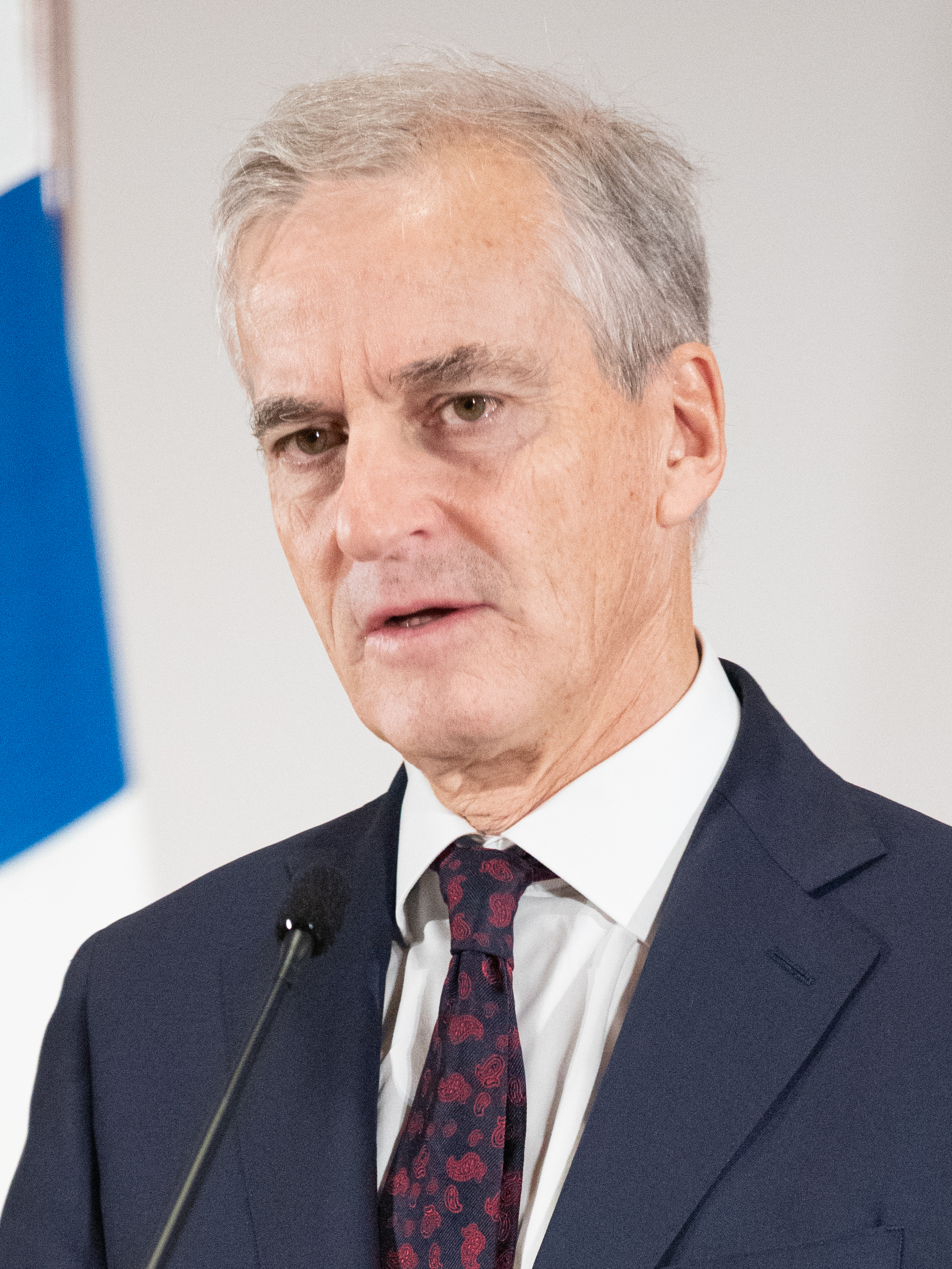
Norway
Jonas Gahr Støre
Prime Minister of Norway
since 2021 election
Støre Cabinet

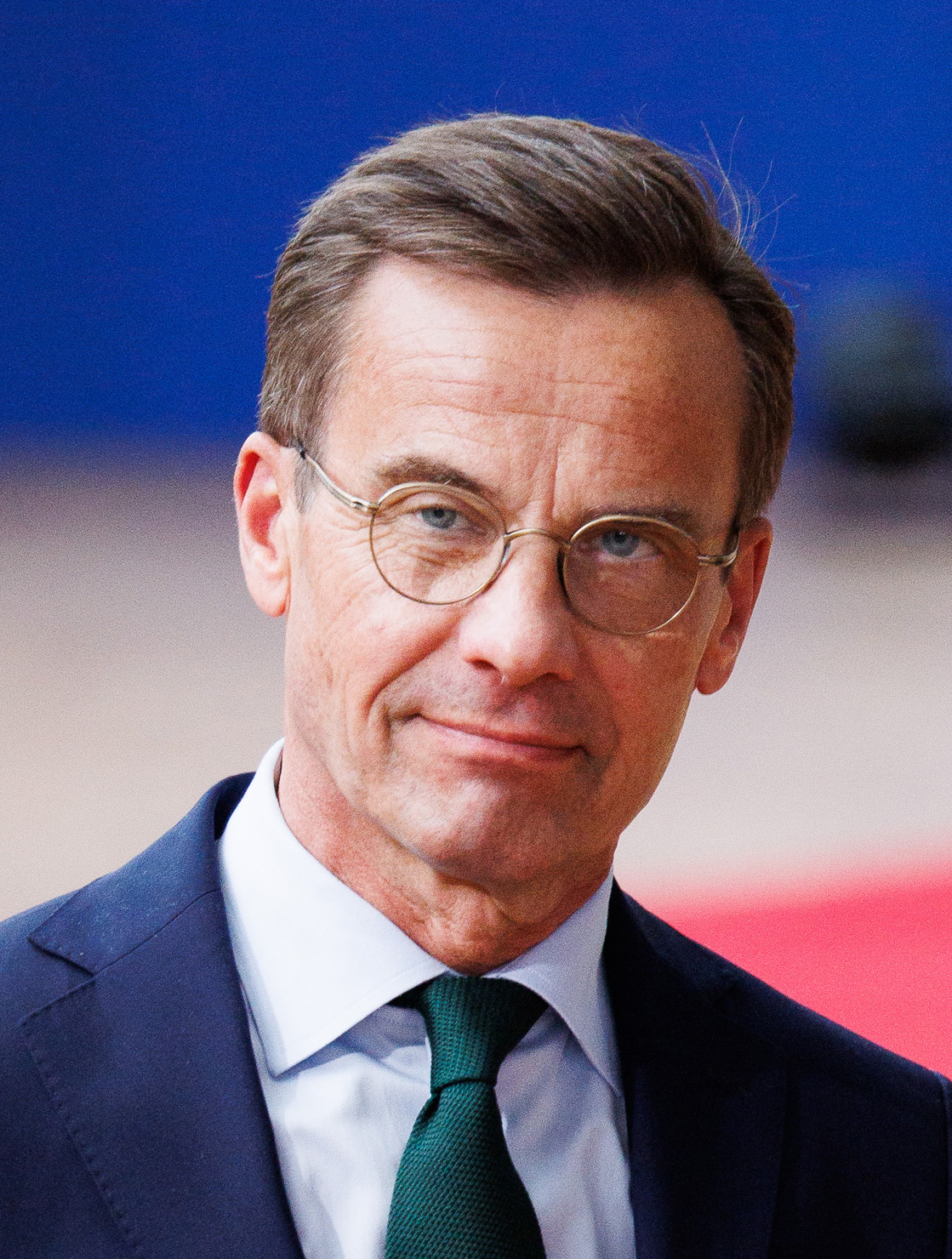
Sweden
Ulf Kristersson
Prime Minister of Sweden
since 2022 election
Kristersson Cabinet
Speakers of Parliament

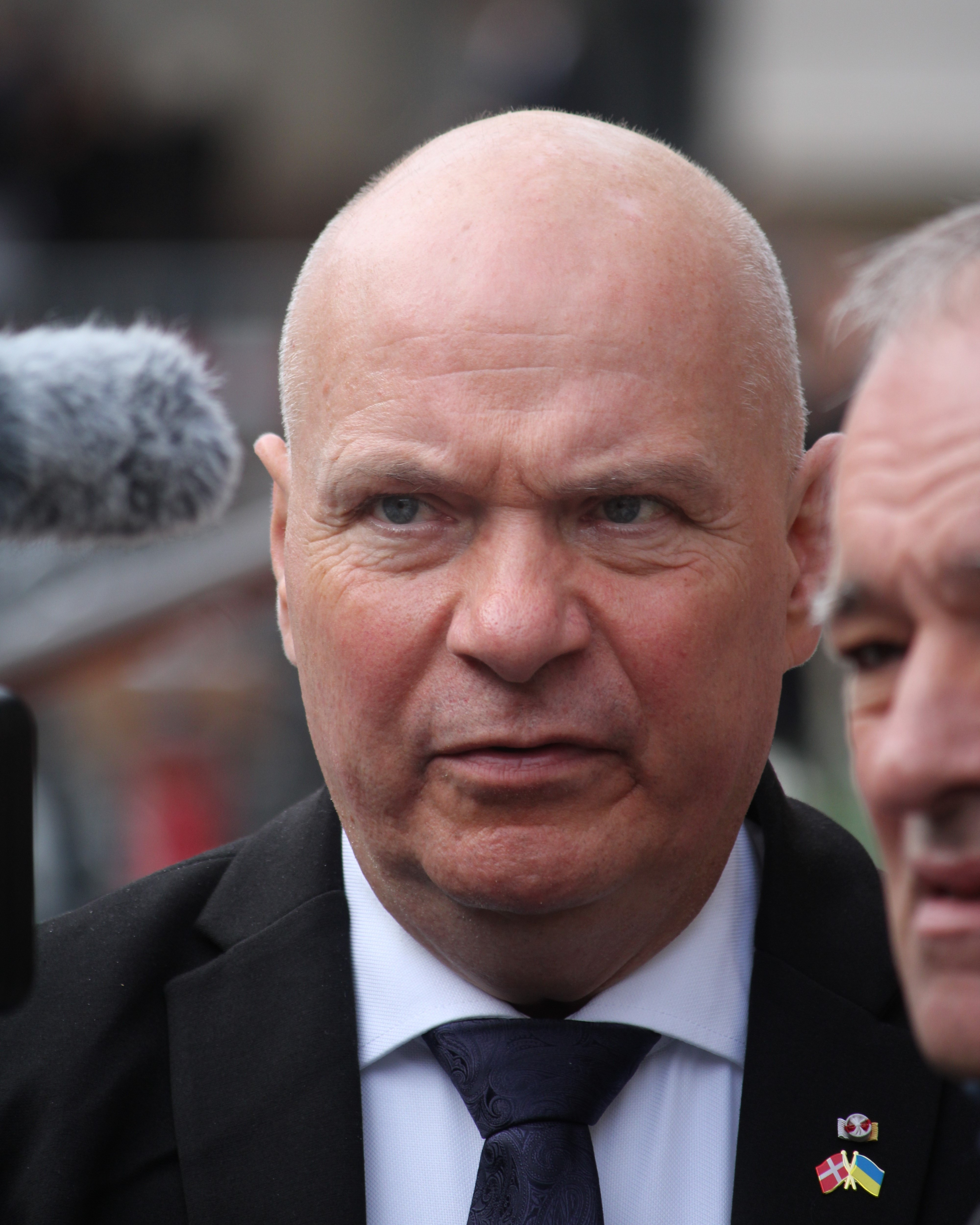
Denmark
Søren Gade
Speaker of the Folketing
since 2022 election

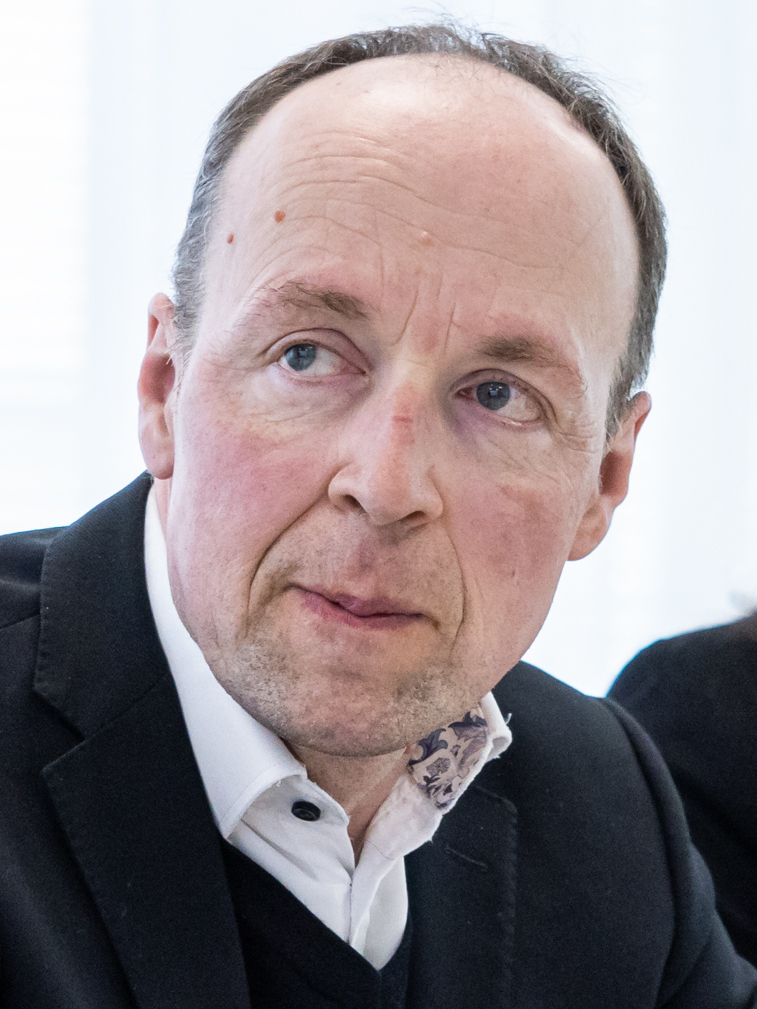
Finland
Jussi Halla-aho
Speaker of the Eduskunta
since 2023

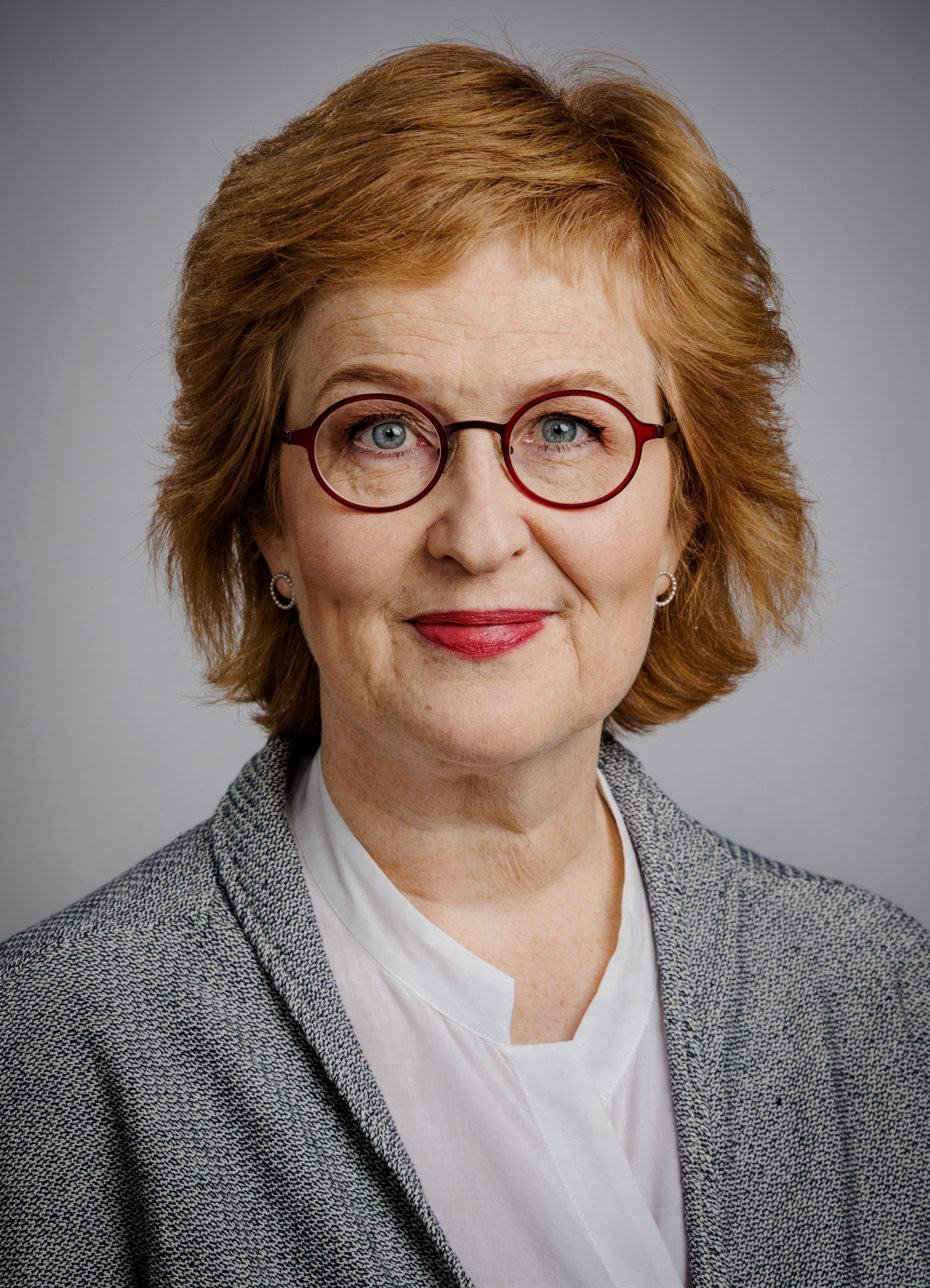
Iceland
Þórunn Sveinbjarnardóttir
Speaker of the Althing
since 2024 election

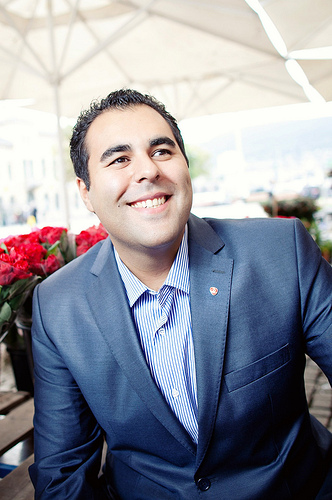
Norway
Masud Gharahkhani
President of the Storting
since 2021

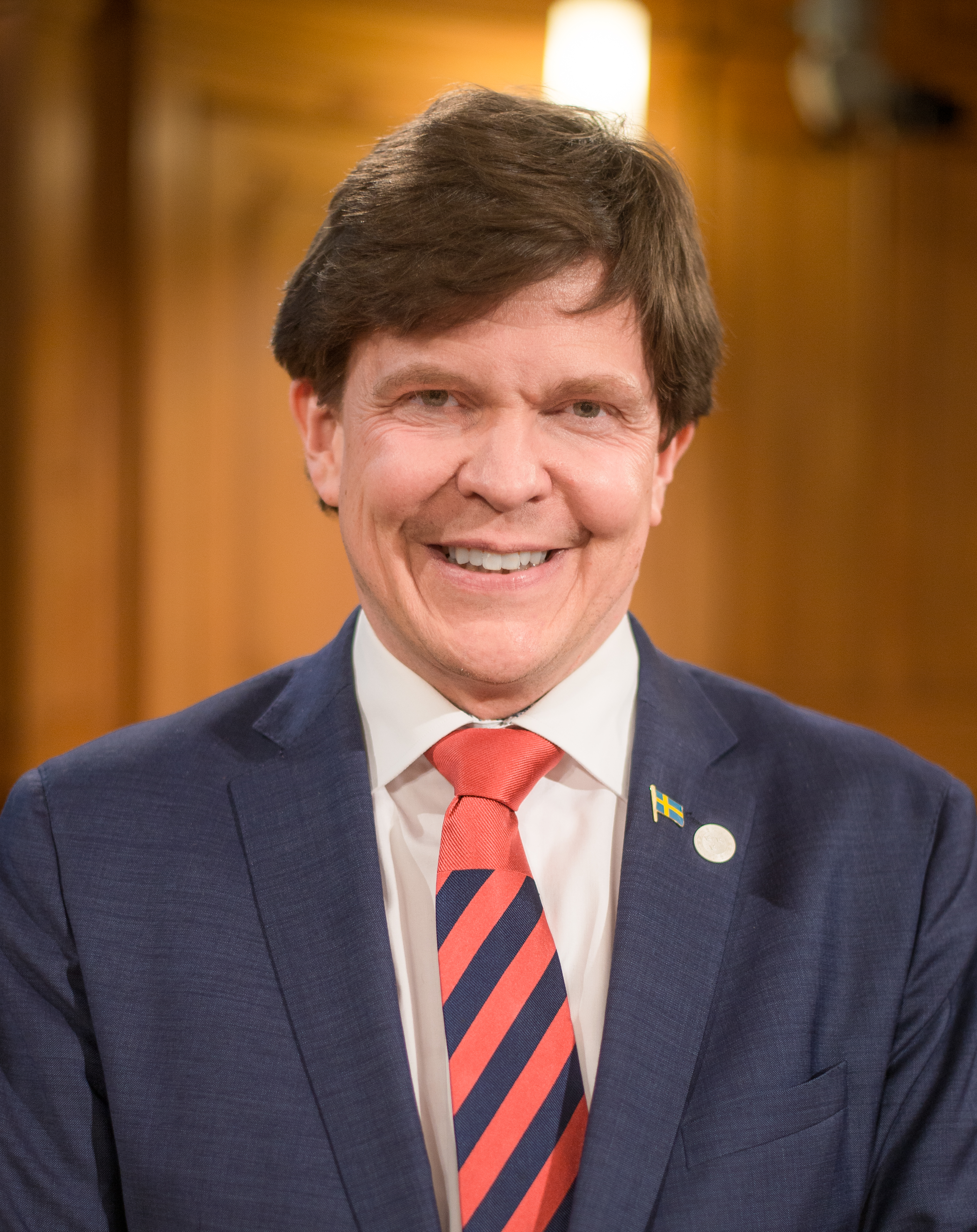
Sweden
Andreas Norlén
Speaker of the Riksdag
since 2018 election
Leaders of the largest party in opposition

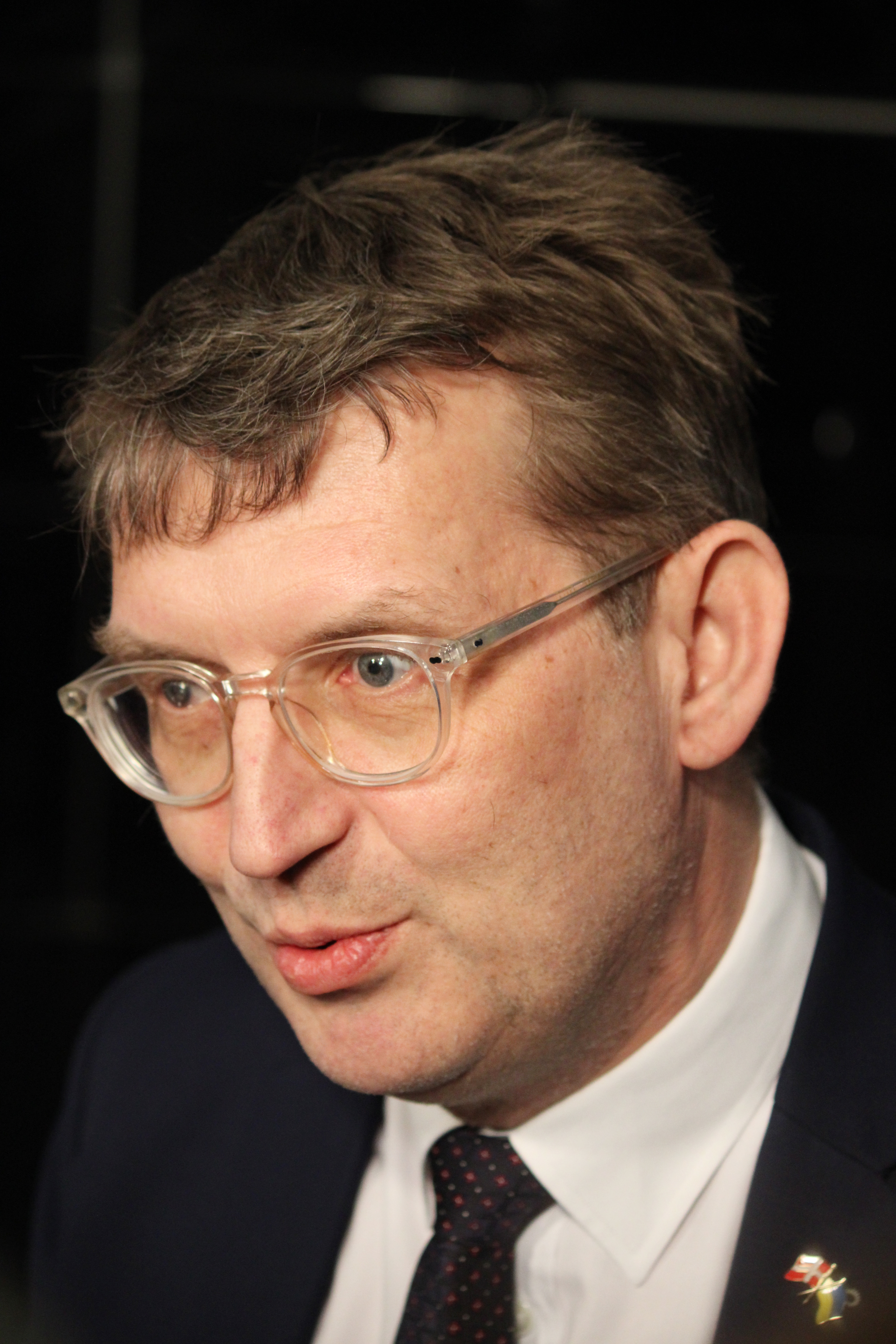
Denmark
Troels Lund Poulsen Chair of Venstre

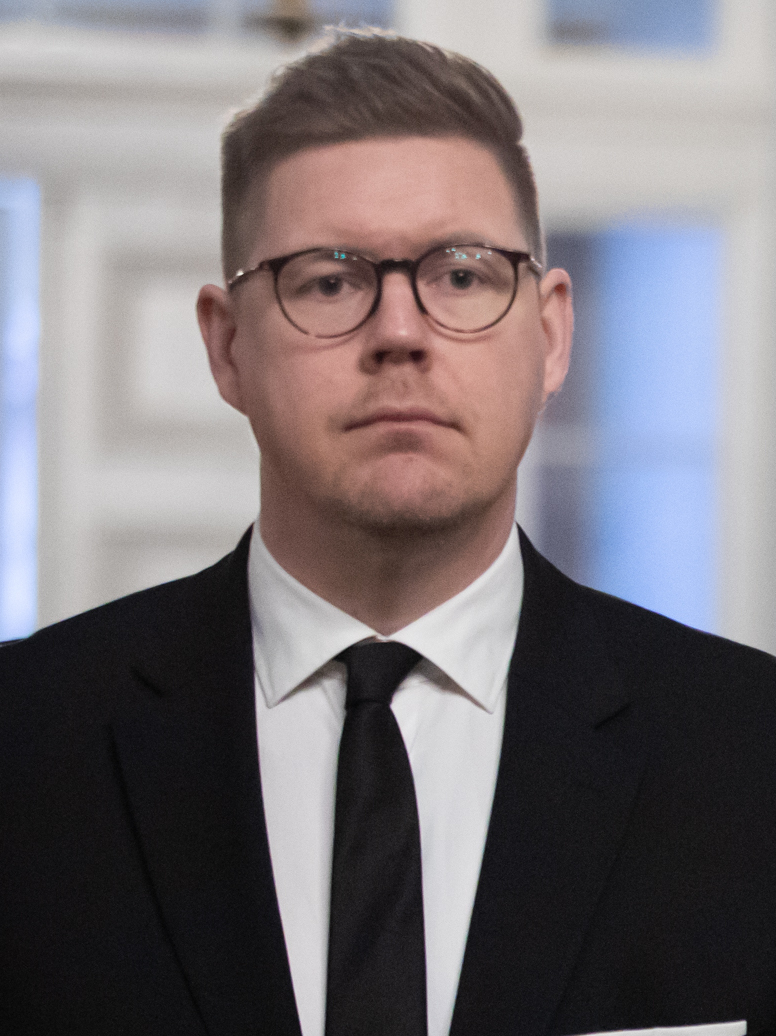
Finland
Antti Lindtman Chair of the Social Democratic Party of Finland

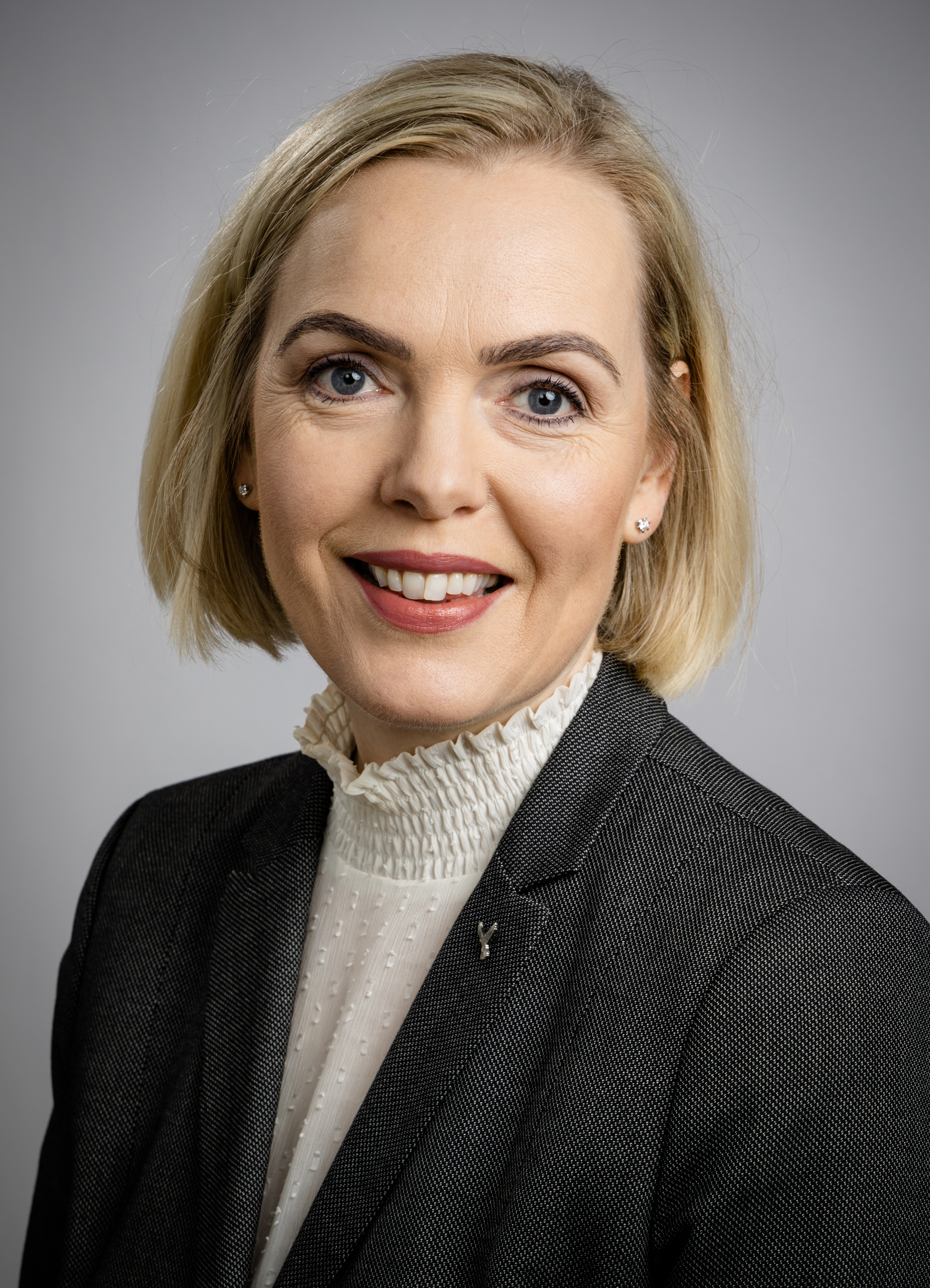
Iceland
Guðrún Hafsteinsdóttir
Chair of the Independence Party

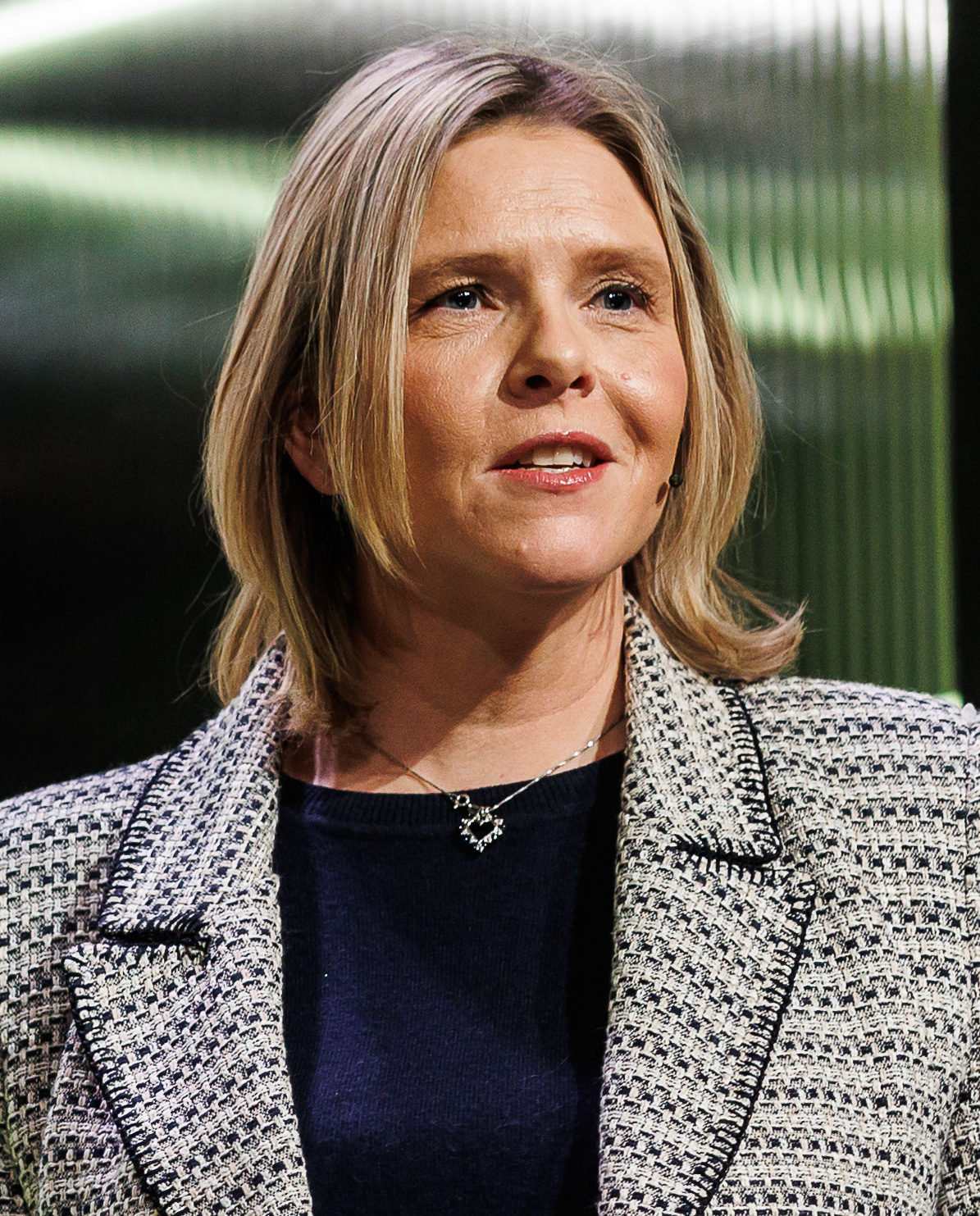
Norway
Sylvi Listhaug
Chair of the Progress Party

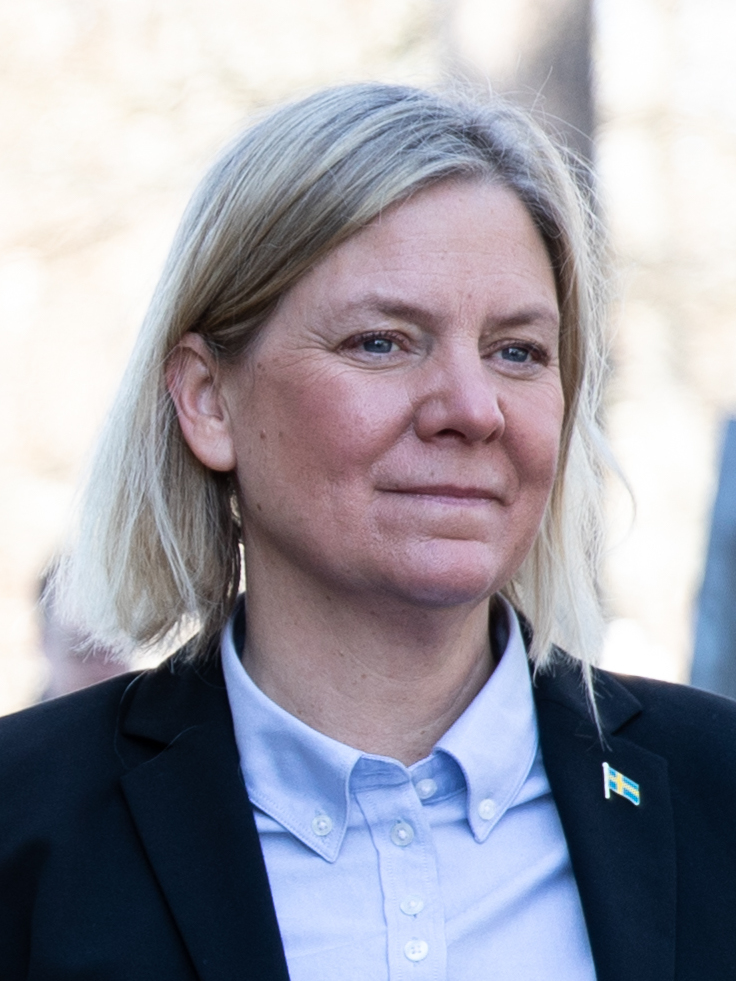
Sweden
Magdalena Andersson
Chair of the Social Democratic Party

== Economic overview ==
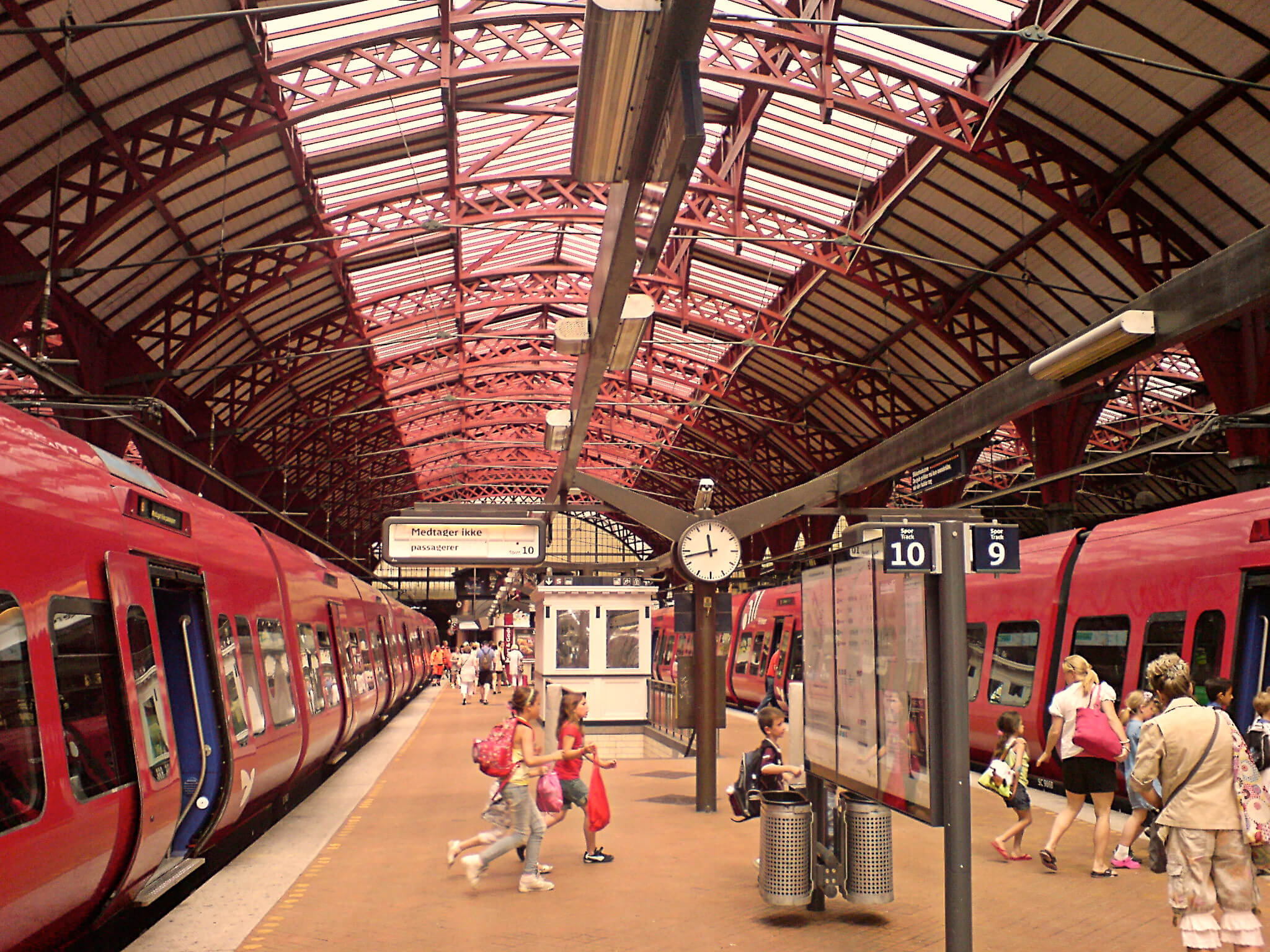
Copenhagen Central Station with S-Trains

GDP per capita of the Nordic sovereign states in USD from 1990 to 2017

The Nordic economies are among the countries in the Western world with the best macroeconomic performance in the recent ten years. Denmark, Finland, Norway and Sweden have for example experienced constant and large excess exports in recent years. Iceland is the only country which has balance of payments deficits as of 2011. At the same time, unemployment is low in most of the Nordic countries compared with the rest of Europe. As a result of the cyclical down-turn, the public balance is now in deficit, except for Norway. Over the past ten years, the Nordic countries had a noticeably larger increase in their gross domestic product (GDP) than the Eurozone. The only exceptions were Denmark and Åland which had a lower growth. Measured by GDP per capita, the Nordic countries have a higher income than the Eurozone countries. Norway's GDP per capita is as high as 80 per cent above the EA17 average and Norway is actually one of the countries with the highest standard of living in the world.

=== Industries ===
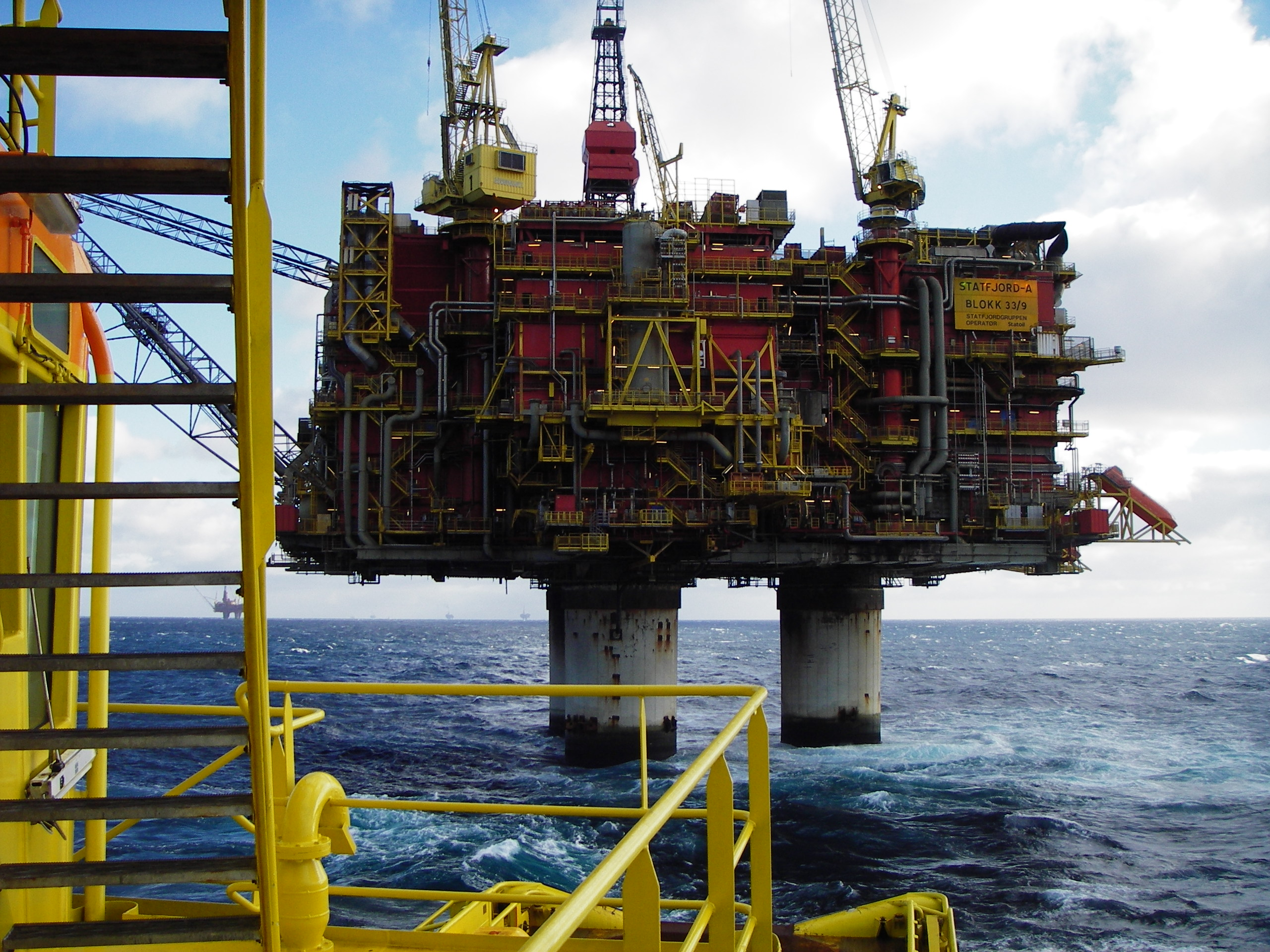
Statfjord oil platform in Norway is owned and operated by Equinor, which is the largest company in the Nordic countries.

Since the late 1990s, the Nordic manufacturing industry has accounted for a slightly declining proportion of the gross domestic product, with Norway being a distinct exception. In Norway, the manufacturing industry's proportion of GDP is still at a high level of around 35 per cent due to the large oil and natural gas sector. In the rest of the Nordic countries, the proportion lies between 15 and 20 per cent. Despite growing production, the manufacturing industry accounts for a decreasing proportion of total employment in the Nordic countries. Among the Nordic countries, Finland is today the number one Nordic industrial country, as the manufacturing industry in Finland accounts for the greatest proportion of the country's jobs, around 16 per cent. By way of comparison, in Denmark, Norway and Iceland it only accounts for less than 13 per cent of total employment.

=== Foreign investments ===
Iceland and Sweden have the highest rate of foreign direct investment, both with regards to foreign companies investing in Iceland and Sweden and Icelandic and Swedish companies investing abroad. However, in 2011 Denmark superseded Sweden regarding outward investments. Looking at a larger time span of ten years, most of the Nordic countries have experienced growth in both inward and outward investments.

=== Energy ===
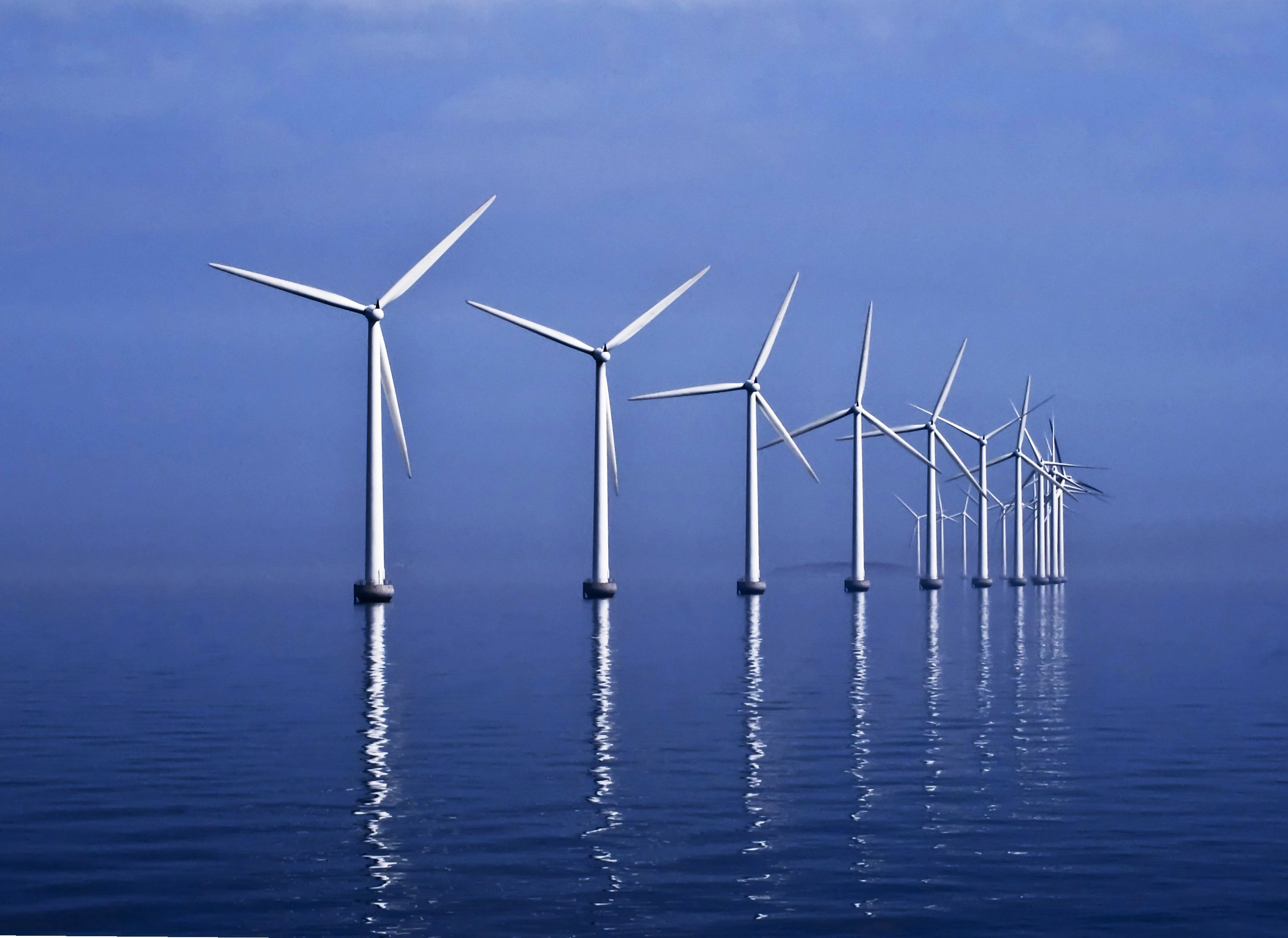
During the recent years, Denmark has invested heavily in windfarms.

The Nordic region is one of the richest sources of energy in the world. Apart from the natural occurrence of fossil fuels such as oil and gas, the Nordic countries also have good infrastructure and technology to exploit renewable energy sources such as water, wind, bio-energy and geothermal heat. Especially Iceland and Norway, but also Finland and Sweden, have a significant production of electricity based on hydro power. Geothermal energy production is the most important source of energy in Iceland, whilst nuclear power is produced in both Finland and in Sweden. The indigenous production of energy in the Nordic countries has risen considerably over the last couple of decades – especially in Denmark and Norway due to oil deposits in the North Sea.

=== Tourism ===
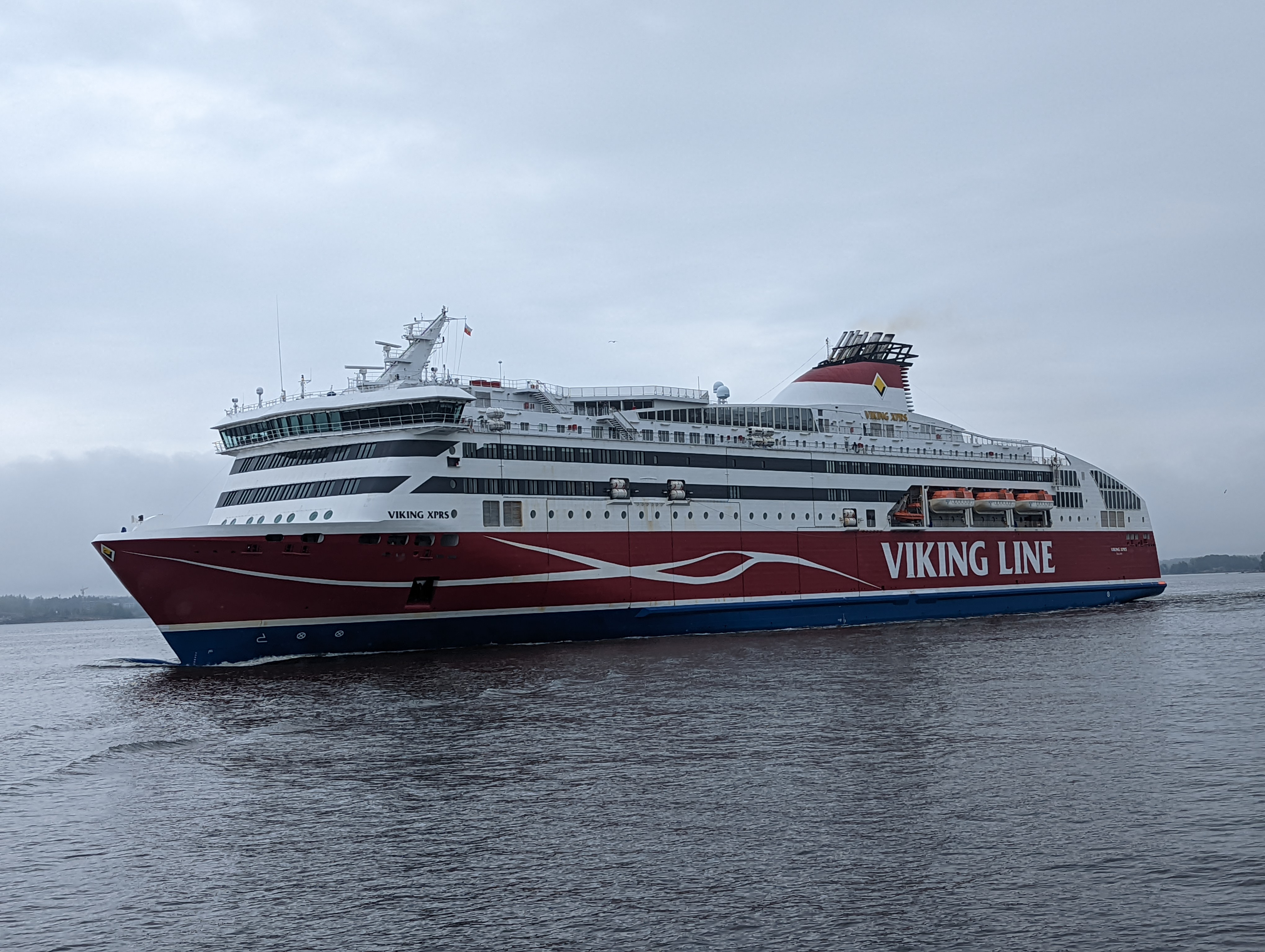
Finnish shipping company Viking Line

The Nordic countries in order of popularity with tourists are Sweden, Norway, Denmark, Finland then Iceland.

== Economy and trade ==
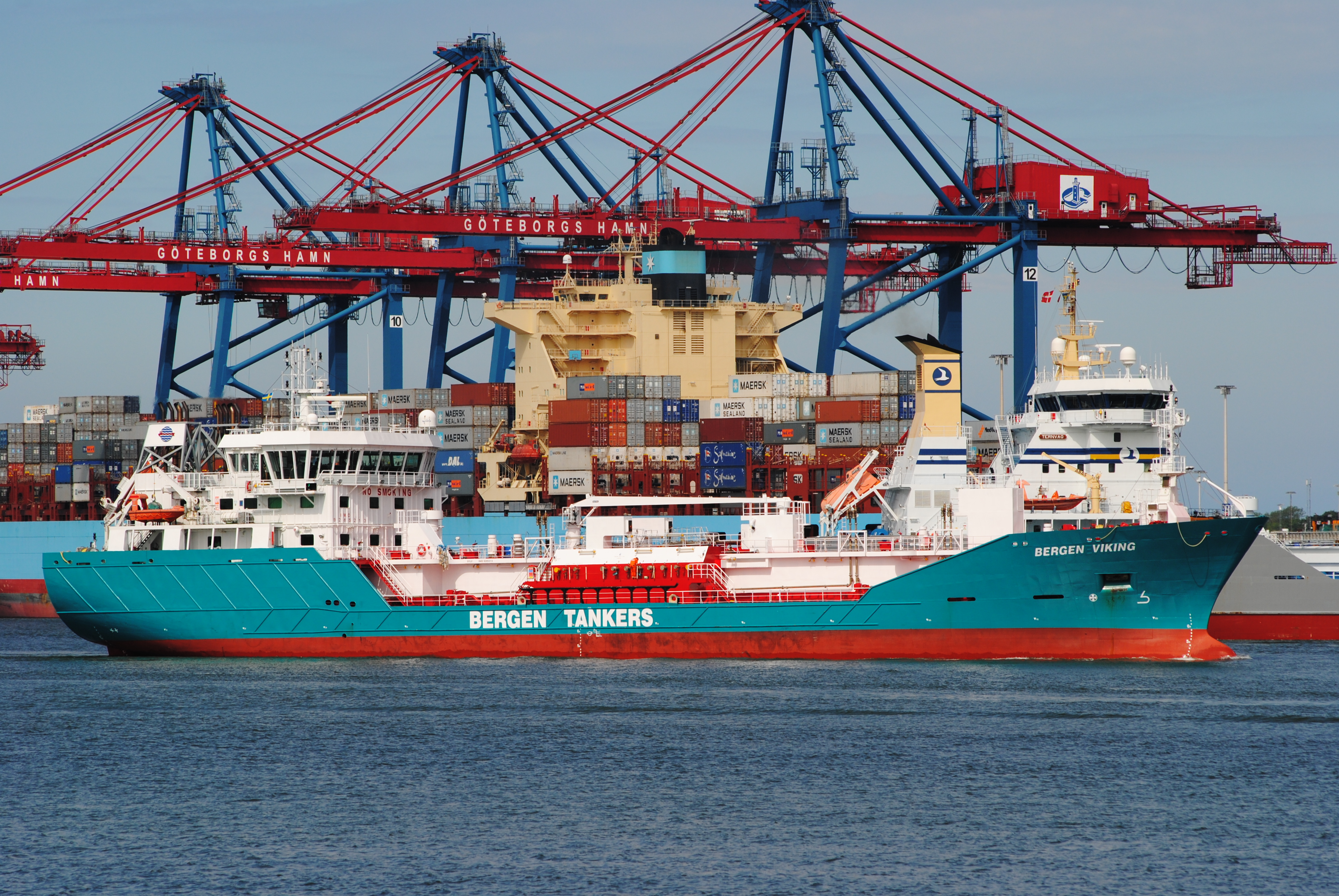
The Port of Gothenburg is the largest port in the Nordic countries.

Nordic cooperation is characterised largely by the international community and the global challenges and opportunities. The Nordic countries, which are relatively small, have always benefited greatly by obtaining common use in cooperation with other countries and institutions. The Nordic economies are small and open, thus making the countries export-dependent. Foreign trade constitutes an important part of the economic activity. Nordic foreign trade in goods, measured as the average of imports and exports, amounts to more than one fourth of GDP in the Nordic countries, significantly above the EU average. All the Nordic countries except Finland had a surplus in their balance of trade in 2012, and every year since 1995, Denmark, Norway, and Sweden have all had greater exports than imports. In 2024, Denmark, Faroe Islands, Norway, and Sweden all maintained a trade surplus, while Finland's trade balance has shown gradual improvement toward neutrality over the past decade.

The trade between the Nordic countries is especially considerable, as about one fifth of their foreign trade is with other Nordic countries. In 2024, 21% of all Nordic imports and 19% of all exports were intra-Nordic, reflecting the region's deep economic integration. The total population of the Nordic countries of around 26 million people makes them far more dependent on each other with respect to exports and imports, compared to for example Germany with a population of 82 million. Sweden had the largest share of both imports and exports among the Nordic countries, followed by Denmark and Norway. Europe, excluding the Nordic countries, remains the largest market, accounting for 55% of imports and 56% of exports in 2024.

In addition to the other Nordic countries, the European Union is their largest trading partner. Especially important is trade with Germany, Belgium, and the Netherlands. Outside of Europe, the United States and China are major trading partners. The United States is a key market for Nordic goods and services, with total U.S.-Nordic trade reaching an estimated $16.8 billion in 2024, up 3.7% from 2023. China-Nordic trade has also seen rapid growth, with bilateral trade reaching $52 billion in 2024, up 6.8% year-on-year, and is projected to exceed $55 billion in 2025. New areas of cooperation include green technology, electric vehicles, and clean energy, with Nordic countries becoming a key market for Chinese EV and battery companies.

A common characteristic in the exports of the Nordic countries is a concentration on a few products. The exports of Greenland and the Faroe Islands are entirely dominated by fish and fish products, to a lesser extent in Iceland where aluminium exports also contribute significantly. Oil and gas are the predominant products exported by Norway, accounting for nearly two-thirds of its export sales in 2024. Finnish exports are dominated by wood, paper, and paper products, as well as telecommunication equipment. Denmark's primary exports include processed food, pharmaceuticals, and chemical products, while Sweden exports cars, wood, paper products, and telecommunication equipment. Germany remains the largest import partner for Denmark, Finland, and Sweden. In Sweden, Germany retained its position as the top import partner in 2023 despite a 4.0% decrease in trade volume, underscoring the enduring economic and geographical ties between the two countries.

The total export value decreased for all Nordic countries after the financial crisis of 2009 and during the pandemic year 2020, reflecting global economic challenges. However, the value of both imports and exports has grown over time, with a steady distribution of trade value among the eight Nordic countries. The Nordic model, characterised by stable inflation, high public sector spending, and extensive welfare benefits, has helped the region maintain strong economic resilience despite external pressures.

=== Intra-Nordic trade and economic integration ===
Intra-Nordic trade is substantial, amounting to a fifth of all imports and exports in the region. The Nordic countries have long been integrated through initiatives such as the Nordic Passport Union and the Helsinki Treaty, and by 2024, all Nordic countries had become members of NATO, further strengthening regional cooperation. The Nordic countries have also deepened their economic ties with the United Kingdom post-Brexit, negotiating comprehensive free trade agreements to mitigate disruptions caused by the UK's departure from the EU.

=== Trade balance and GDP contribution ===
Nordic foreign trade in goods and services remains a critical driver of economic growth. Sweden and Denmark have the highest net trade values, with trade contributing significantly to their GDP. The region's economies are expected to see modest GDP growth in 2025, supported by household consumption, lower interest rates, and a gradual recovery in global demand. However, uncertainties such as global trade frictions and tariffs pose risks to export-led growth.

== Demographics ==
Country	Capital	Population	Area (km^{2})
Denmark	Copenhagen	5,942,520	42,894
Greenland	Nuuk	55,877	2,166,086
Faroe Islands	Tórshavn	50,778	1,396
Finland	Helsinki	5,509,717	338,534
Åland	Mariehamn	29,489	1,580
Iceland	Reykjavík	350,710	103,440
Norway	Oslo	5,295,619	385,203
Sweden	Stockholm	10,313,447	447,420

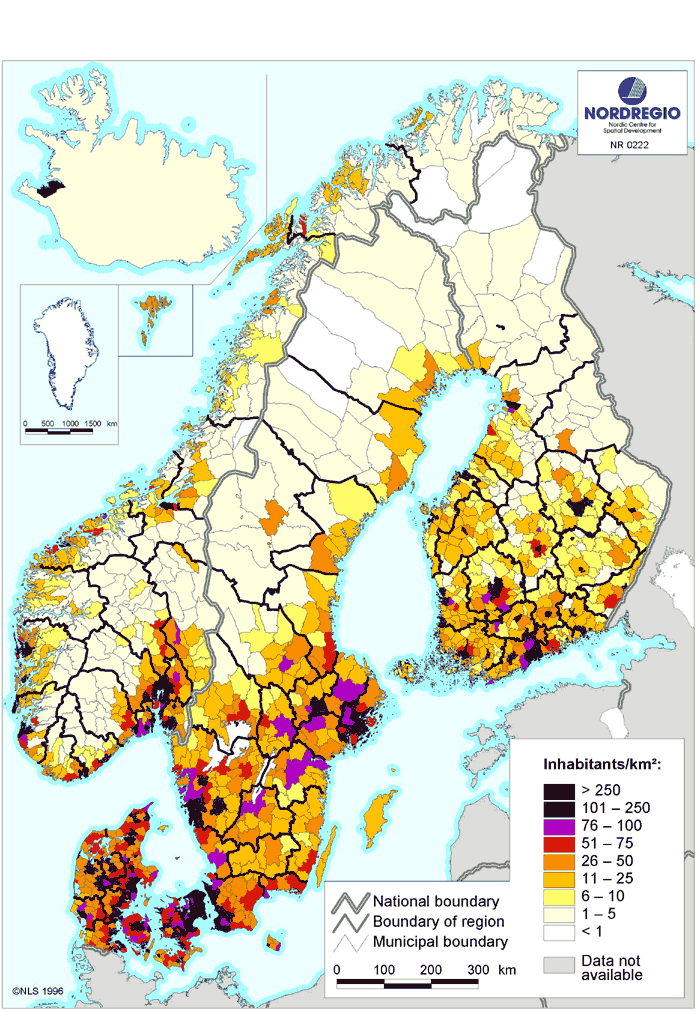
Population density map of the Nordic countries (1996)

At the beginning of the 20th century, almost 12 million people lived in the Nordic countries. Today, the population has increased to 27 million people. The Nordic countries have one of the lowest population densities in the world. The low density is partly due to the fact that many parts of the Nordic countries are marginal areas, where nature puts limitations on settlement. In the four most populous of the five Nordic countries, around 20 per cent of the population is to be found in the vicinity of the respective capitals. In Iceland, this percentage is even higher, with more than 60 per cent of Icelanders residing at or nearby the capital city of Reykjavík.

During the past 100 years, population growth has been strongest in Greenland, where the population has multiplied by almost five, from 12,000 to 56,000 people. In Iceland, the increase has gone from 78,000 to 322,000 people. The population on the Faroe Islands has more than tripled, from 15,000 to 48,000 people. The Swedish and Ålandic populations are the only ones that have not at least doubled. Since 1990, the total population in the Nordic countries has increased by more than 2.8 million people (12 per cent) – the most in Iceland (27 per cent) and in Norway and Åland by 19 and close to 18 per cent. Certain regions in Finland, Norway and Sweden have experienced a decline in the population due to urbanisation, but at the national level all the Nordic countries have experienced growth. Compared to 2005, both the Faroe Islands and Greenland have experienced a minor decline. Iceland has also experienced shorter periods with a declining population. The Danish population is expected to increase by 8 per cent until 2035, while Finland and Sweden expect an increase in the population of about 10 and almost 16 per cent respectively.

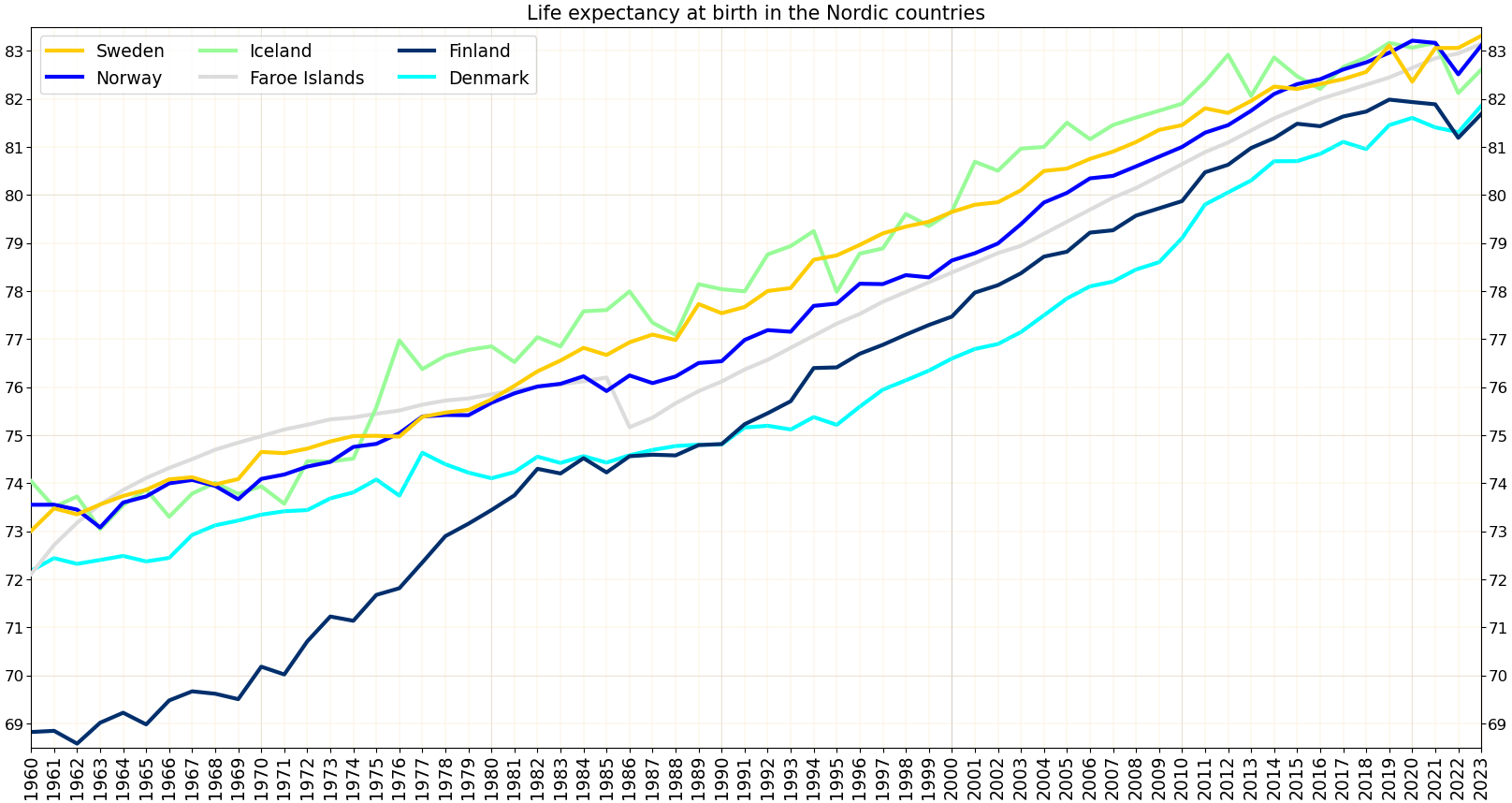
Development of life expectancy in the Nordic countries

Life expectancy is rising in all the Nordic countries, though the levels vary greatly. Life expectancy for men in Greenland is 68.3 years (2011), compared to 80.8 years for men in Iceland. Women in the Faroe Islands and in Åland are expected to live the longest – more than 84 years. The population in the Nordic countries is getting older and according to the population projection for the Nordic countries as a whole, the share of the population above the age of 80 will reach 8.4 per cent in 2040, as compared to the 2013 level of 4.7 per cent. The share of population 80 years or older has increased from 1990 to 2013. The increase in the share of people above the age of 80 over the last 10 years is partly due to the fact that the death rate has fallen for almost all age groups and partly that the number of births has been low during the same period. In the next 25 years, the demographic dependency ratio is expected to have the strongest growth in Finland and Åland. According to the most recent population forecasts in Finland and Åland, in 2030 it is expected that people over 65 will make up 50 per cent of the adult population. Sweden and Denmark can look forward to a relatively modest increase in the next decades. Iceland and Norway seem to maintain their positions with the lowest proportions of elderly people in the Nordic countries.

=== Languages ===
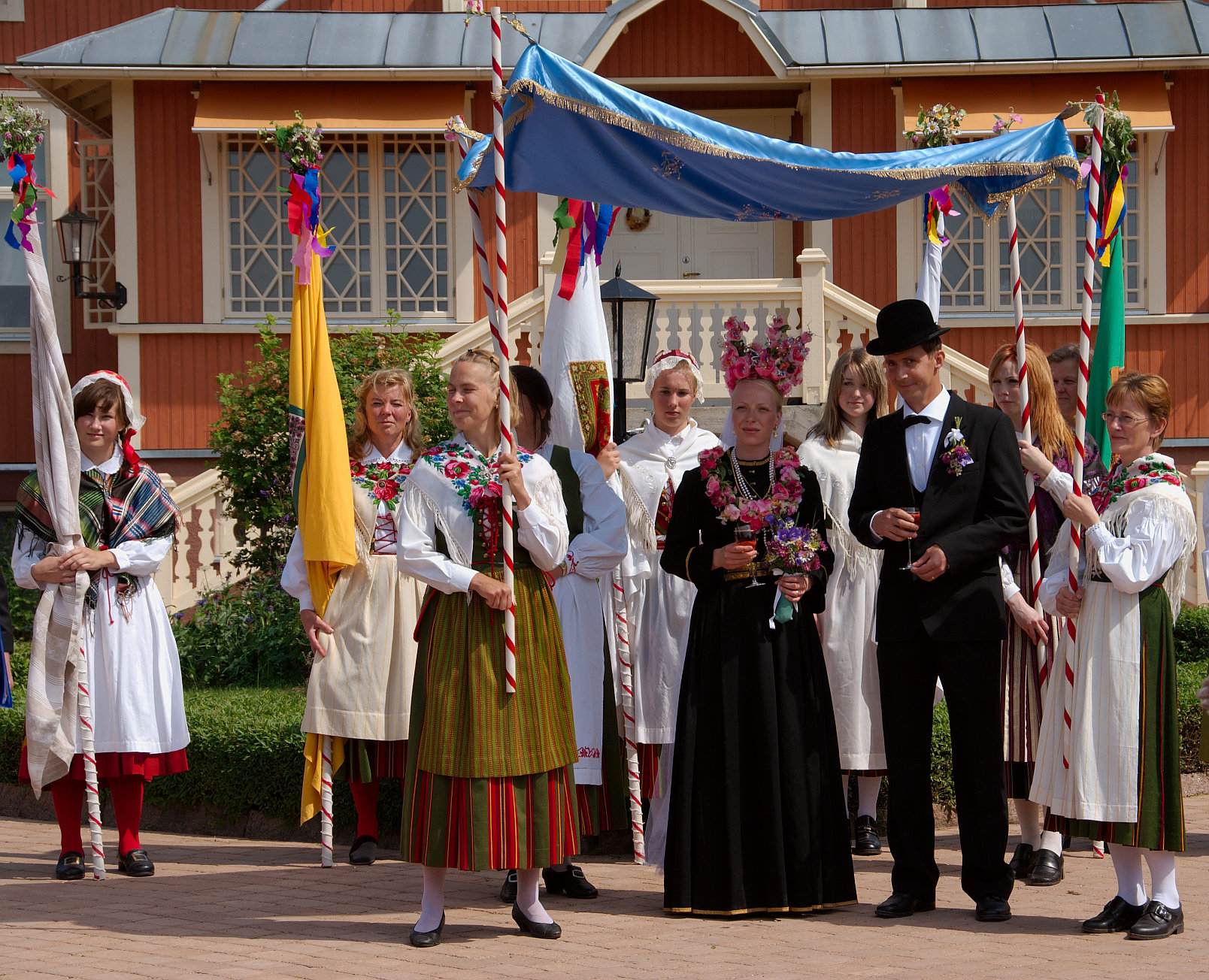
Historical reenactment of a farmer wedding in Jomala, Åland

Most of the Nordic languages belong to one of three linguistic families: North Germanic languages, Finno-Ugric languages and Eskimo–Aleut languages. Although the area is linguistically heterogeneous, with three unrelated language groups, the common linguistic heritage is one of the factors making up the Nordic identity.

Danish, Faroese, Icelandic, Norwegian and Swedish belong to the North Germanic branch of the Indo-European languages. The languages have developed from a common Nordic language, but have moved away from each other during the past 1000 years. However, it is still possible for Danish, Norwegian and Swedish speakers to understand each other. These languages are taught in school throughout the Nordic countries: for example, Swedish is a mandatory subject in Finnish schools, and Danish is mandatory in Faroese schools. Approximately 5,3 per cent of population of Finland speak Swedish as their mother tongue.

In the Finnish-Sami group of the Finno-Ugric languages, Finnish is the most widely spoken language in the Nordic countries. However, other languages in this family are also spoken in the region. Various Sami languages are spoken in northern Finland, Norway and Sweden. Karelian is spoken a little in Finland, the Kven language in Norway and Meänkieli or "Torne Valley Finnish" in Sweden. Finns are also the largest immigrant group in Sweden, around 4.46 per cent of the total population; and Finnish is an official minority language of Sweden.

Greenlandic or Kalaallisut belongs to the Inuit branch of the Eskimo-Aleut languages and is spoken in Greenland. The language is related to a number of languages spoken in northern Canada and Alaska. As of 2009, the Greenland Home rule does not require Danish to be taught or the use of Danish for official purposes.

A number of other minority languages also exist in the region. German is spoken by a minority in Southern Jutland and their cultural and language rights are protected by the government. Finnish Kale, Norwegian and Swedish Travellers and other Romani peoples of the Nordic countries have the right to maintain and develop their language and culture. Yiddish is also an official minority language in Sweden. Besides the so-called "natural" languages national variants of sign languages are used. The Icelandic Sign Language is derived from the Danish, while the Finnish Sign Language is developed on the basis of the Swedish variant. The right to use sign language is set in the Finnish Language Act and in Sweden the Swedish Sign Language is an official minority language.

The North Germanic languages in the Nordic countries

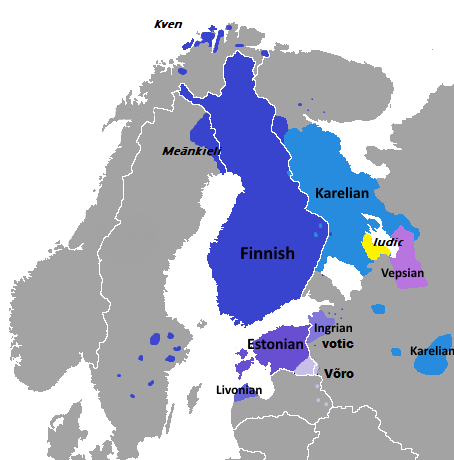
The Finnic languages in Northern Europe

=== Migration ===
In 2012, net migration had the greatest impact on the rise in population in Sweden. That was also the case with Denmark, Finland, Åland and Norway. In the Faroe Islands, Greenland and Iceland, natural population increase had the greatest impact on the population change, but both Greenland and the Faroe Islands still had a slight decrease in the population due to a negative net migration in 2012.

A large proportion of the migration in the Nordic countries occurs between the countries themselves, largely as the result of the free labour market and liberal rules for the exchange of students. This trend has led to an increasing number of foreign citizens in the Nordic countries during the past few decades. In all the countries, the major part of the foreign citizens is non-Nordic. That is not the case for Greenland and the Faroe Islands, which have a high proportion of other Nordic citizens. Non-nationals range from 47 per cent of the total immigration in Iceland, to 89 per cent in Norway. In 2013 the largest proportions of non-nationals were in Norway and Denmark, where they account for 8.9 and 8.8 per cent of the population. The proportion of non-nationals in the Finnish population is small compared to the other Nordic countries – 3.6 per cent in 2013 – but the proportion has risen significantly during and after the 1990s.

=== Sami people ===
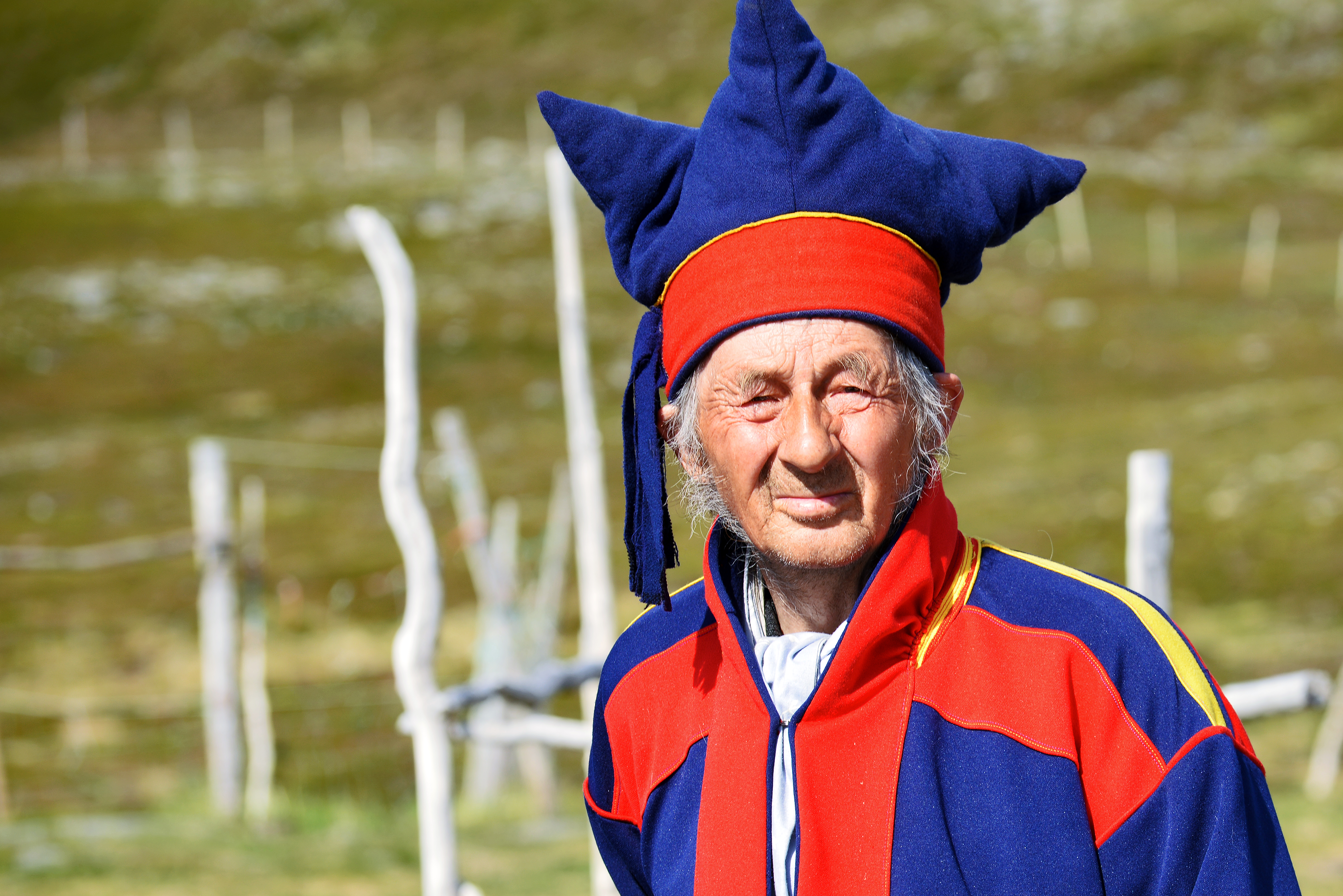
Sami man at Honningsvåg, Norway, wearing the traditional Gákti

The Sami people, also spelled Sámi or Saami, are a Finno-Ugric people who have their traditional settlement areas in northern Finland, Norway and Sweden and Western Russia. Most Sami live in Norway, followed by Sweden and Finland, while the fewest Sami live in Russia. Because the countries do not make an official record of who has the Sami identity or background, no one knows the exact number of the Sami people. The Sami are the only indigenous people of the Nordic countries excluding Greenland that are recognised and protected under the international conventions of indigenous peoples. They are hence the northernmost indigenous people of Europe. There are several Sami languages.

Traditionally, the Sami have plied a variety of livelihoods, including coastal fishing, fur trapping and sheep herding. However, the best known Sami livelihood is semi-nomadic reindeer herding. For traditional, environmental, cultural and political reasons, reindeer herding is legally reserved to Sami people in certain regions of the Nordic countries. Nowadays, the Sami work in all sectors, although the primary industries are still important culture bearers for the Sami people.

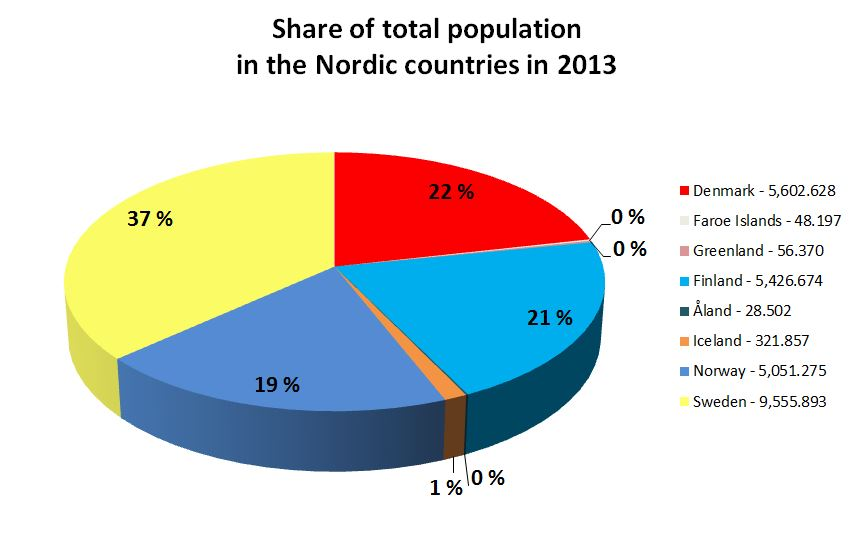
Share of total population of the Nordic countries by country in January 2013

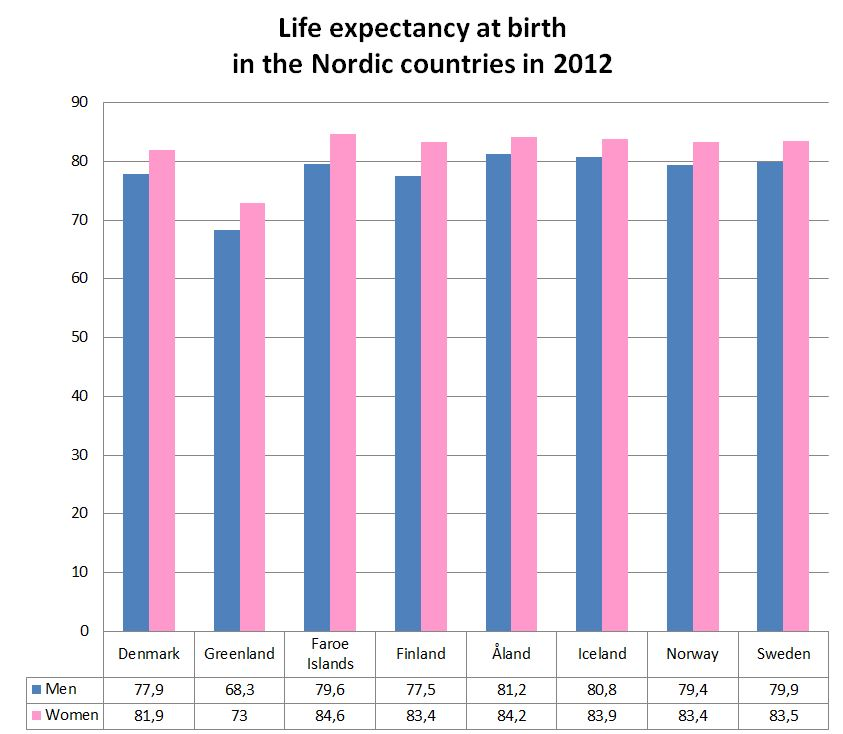
Life expectancy at birth in the Nordic countries in 2012

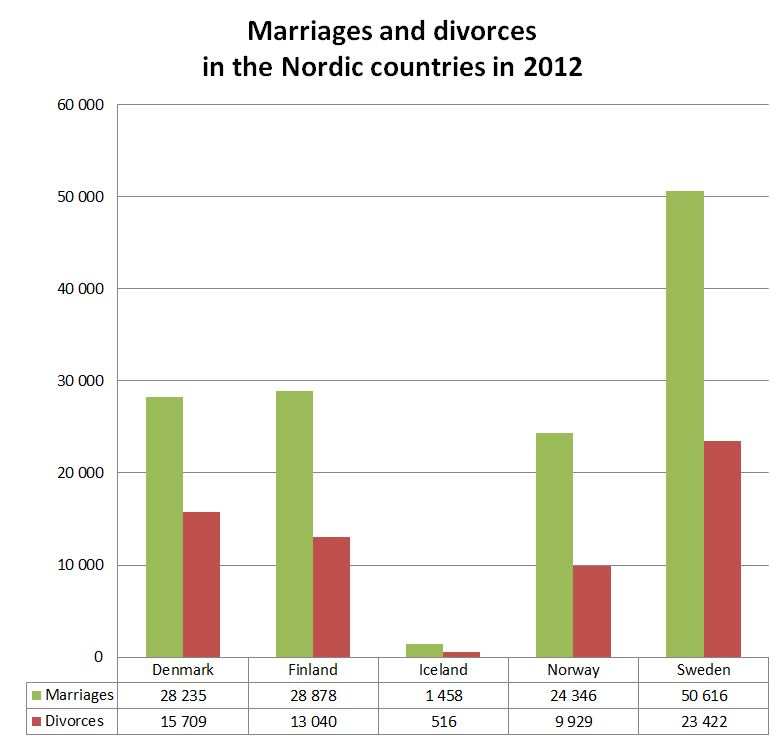
Marriages and divorces in the Nordic countries in 2012

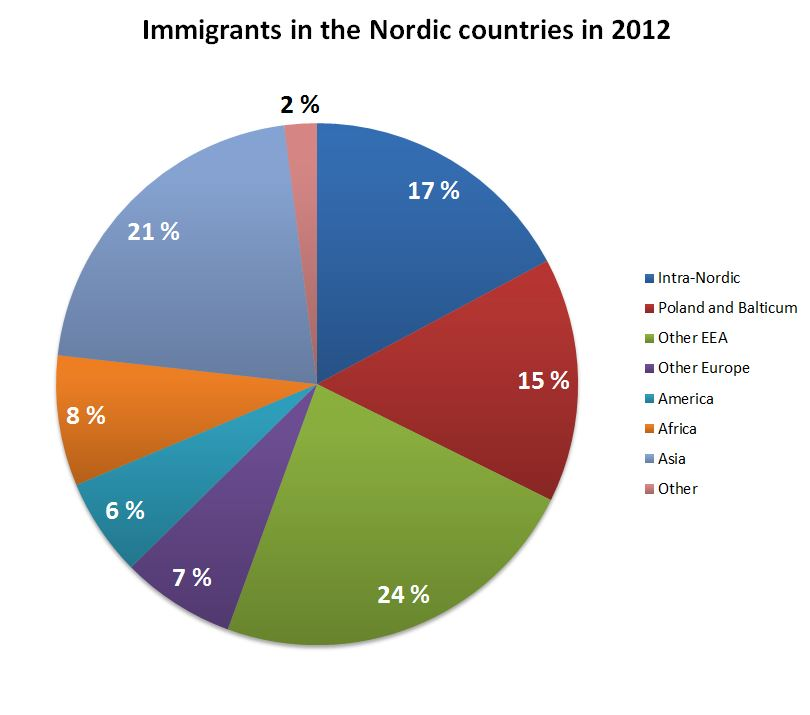
Immigrants in the Nordic countries in 2012

== Culture ==
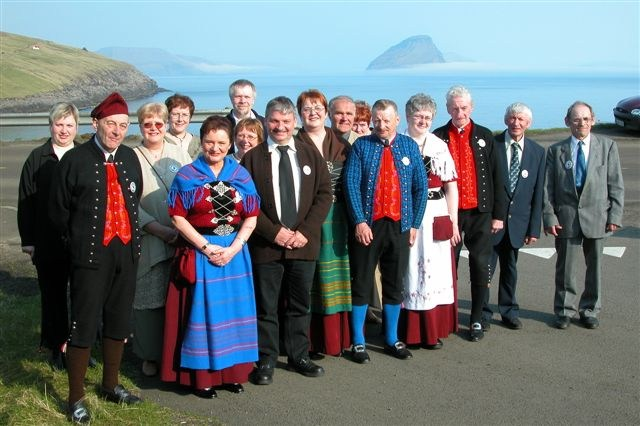
Faroese folk dancers in national costumes

Nordic countries have historically had some of the most socially progressive cultures in the world, and culture is one of the main bases of cooperation between them. The policies of the Nordic countries with respect to cultural life, mass media and religion have many shared values and features in common. However, some differences may be seen, for instance in cultural institutions that arise from historical circumstances. In both Denmark and Sweden, there are cultural institutions with roots in the traditions of the royal courts. In these countries, national institutions formed the foundation of cultural life at an early stage while in Norway cultural institutions began to form later.

Iceland has the highest government expenditure on culture, a total of 3.3 per cent of its GDP in 2011. Denmark comes second with a total of 1.6 per cent of GDP in 2011. Sweden spend the least in 2011 with 1.1 per cent. Looking at per capita expenditure, Iceland again has the highest expenditure with Norway coming second. Greenland spends the third highest amount on culture and leisure per capita. In Iceland and Norway, expenditures have more than doubled since 2000. In the other Nordic countries, expenditures have gone up between 40 and 50 per cent in the same period.

Denmark has the most museums, a total of 274, but museums in Åland and Iceland have the most visitors, an average of 4 and 5 visits per inhabitant. Many theatres in the Nordic countries receive public funding. Theatre funding constitutes a major share of allocations within the cultural area in all the countries. All countries have national theatres, where plays, ballets and operas are performed. In addition to the national theatres, there are professional regional theatres, which are also supported by the state, counties or municipalities. Most countries also have a few private theatres and many amateur ensembles, which may be supported at least partially by municipalities, primarily.

The Nordic Culture Fund, established in 1966, aims to support a broad spectrum of cultural cooperations between the Nordic countries. The Fund's ambition is to enable talented artists, both professionals and amateurs, to enrich each other via the cultural diversity that exists among the 26 million or more people of the Region. Its activities are based on an agreement between the Nordic countries, which came into force in 1967. The Fund receives its money in the form of an annual grant from the Nordic Council of Ministers.

=== Music ===
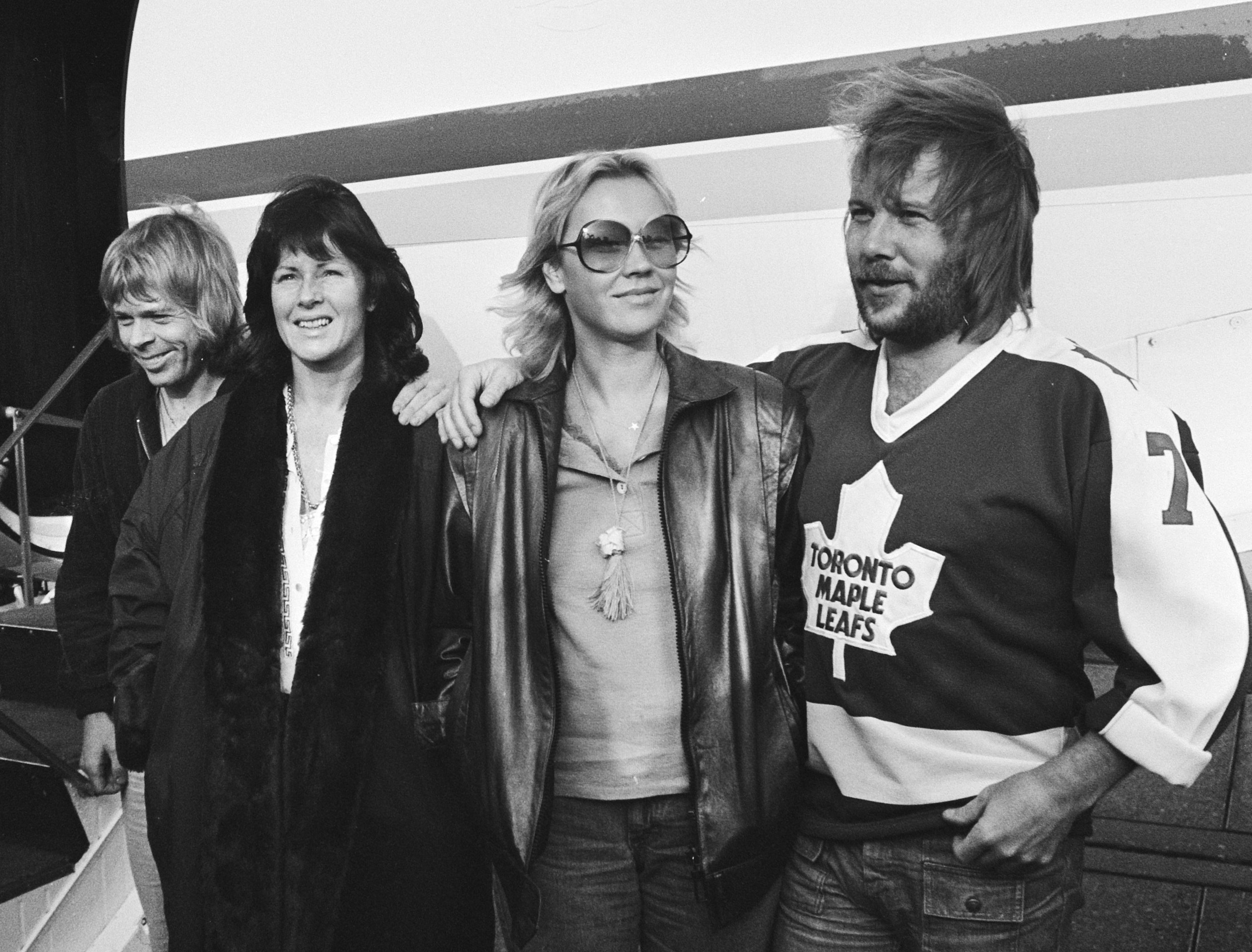
ABBA is one of the best-selling music artists of all time.

Nordic countries share certain traditions in music, many of which have diverged significantly. In folk music, Denmark, Iceland, Norway, Sweden and the Faroe Islands share many common aspects. Greenland's Inuit culture has its own musical traditions, influenced by Scandinavian culture. Finland shares many cultural similarities with both the other Nordic countries as well as Estonia. The Sami have their own unique culture, with ties to the neighboring cultures.

Art music has a strong position in Nordic countries. Apart from state-owned opera houses, there are symphony orchestras in most major cities. The most prominent historical composers from Nordic countries are the Finn Jean Sibelius, the Dane Carl Nielsen and the Norwegian Edvard Grieg. Of contemporary composers, the Finns Magnus Lindberg, Kaija Saariaho and Esa-Pekka Salonen are among the most often performed in the world.

Rock and roll influences that came from the United States and United Kingdom were the start of the Nordic pop scene, but influences from the Nordic folk music can still be found today in popular music. Common characteristic in Nordic pop music is that it can often be either very lighthearted pop music or very dark metal. Some of the most well-known Nordic music groups include ABBA, Ace of Base, a-ha, Aqua, Björk, The Cardigans, Europe, Hanoi Rocks, Roxette, The Rasmus, Kaizers Orchestra and The Spotnicks. Sweden and Finland have possibly the largest music industries in the area, especially Sweden which is the largest exporter of pop music per capita and the third largest overall after the United States and the United Kingdom. Norway, Iceland and Denmark have all had successful domestic record industries for many years.

The Nordic metal scene is highly visible compared to other genres from the region. Many big names such as Amon Amarth, Children of Bodom, In Flames, Meshuggah and Opeth originate from the Nordic countries. Nordic metal bands have had a long and lasting influence on the metal subculture alongside their counterparts in the United Kingdom and the United States. The black metal genre was developed in Norway by bands such as Mayhem, Darkthrone, Burzum, Immortal and Emperor and the related genre of Viking metal was developed throughout the Nordic region by bands such as Bathory, Enslaved, Burzum, Emperor, Einherjer, Moonsorrow and Amon Amarth.

Since 2000, the total sale of music has declined by almost 50 per cent in all the Nordic countries and at the same time digital sales have increased (covering both downloads and streaming). In Denmark, Norway and Finland, the sale of digital music has increased by 400 per cent since 2006 and now amounts to 39, 27 and 25 per cent of the total sale in 2010/2011. In Denmark and Sweden, sales of digital music rose almost eight-fold in the same period and now represent 51 per cent of the total sale. In Iceland, digital sales still only represent three per cent of the total sale.

=== Literature ===
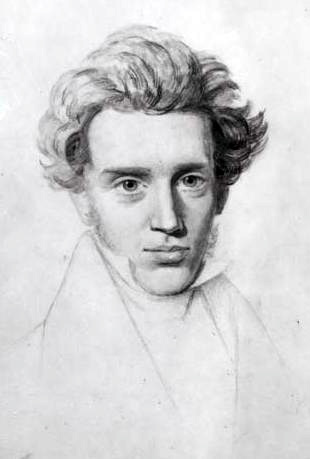
Søren Kierkegaard is considered to be the first existentialist philosopher.

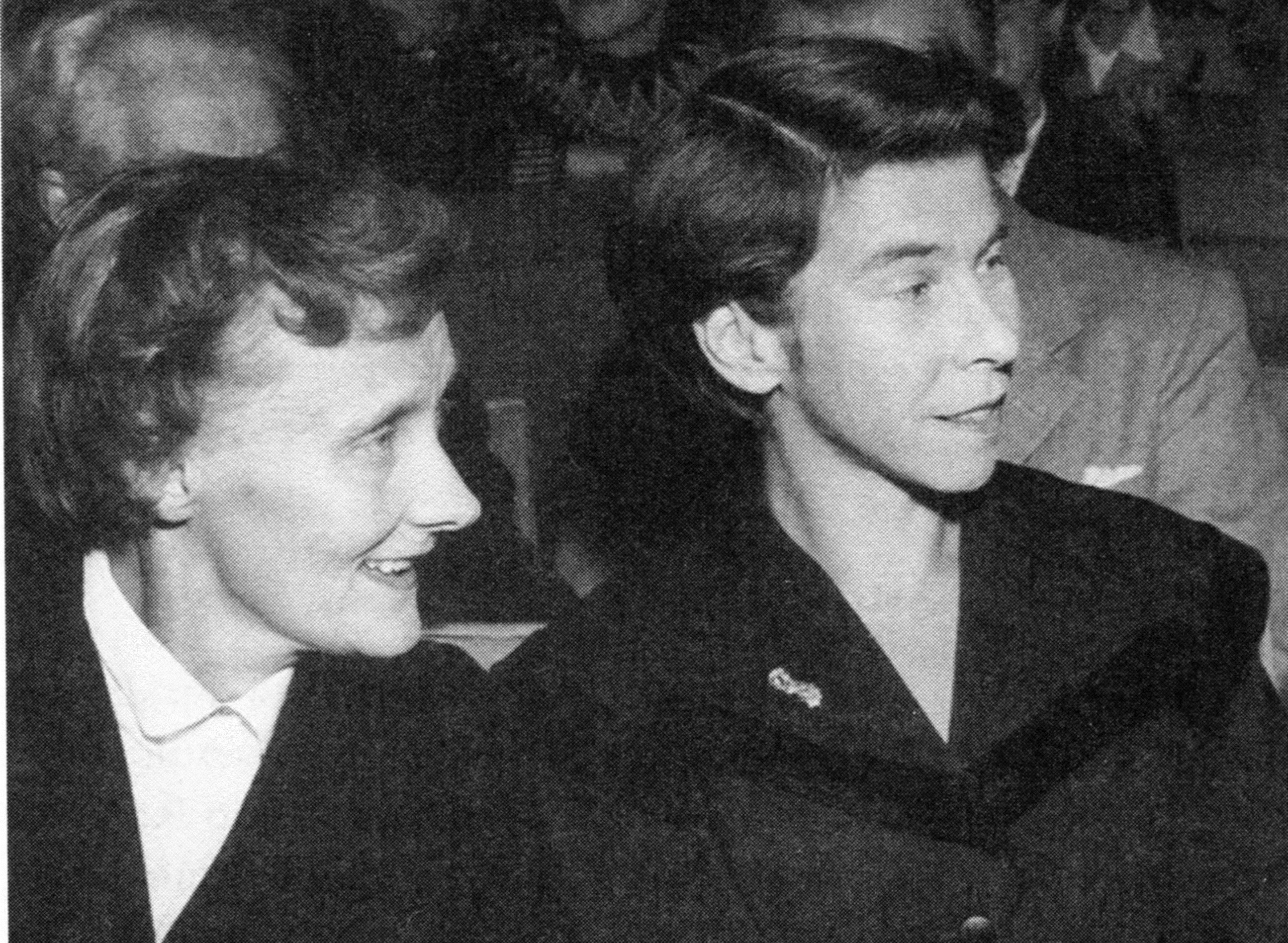
Swedish author Astrid Lindgren together with Finnish author Tove Jansson in Stockholm in 1958

The earliest written records from Scandinavia are runic inscriptions on memorial stones and other objects. Some of those contain allusions to Norse mythology and even short poems in alliterative verse. The best known example is the elaborate Rök runestone (c. 800) which alludes to legends from the migration age. The oldest of the Eddic poems are believed to have been composed in the 9th century, though they are only preserved in 13th-century manuscripts. They tell of the myths and heroic legends of Scandinavia. Skaldic poetry is mostly preserved in late manuscripts but was preserved orally from the 9th century onwards and also appears on runestones, such as the Karlevi Runestone. In Iceland the sagas of Icelanders are the best-known specimens of Icelandic literature. In Finland the most famous collection of folk poetry is by far the Kalevala, which is the national epic of the country.

Nordic countries have produced important and influential literature. Henrik Ibsen, a Norwegian playwright, was largely responsible for the popularity of modern realistic drama in Europe, with plays like The Wild Duck and A Doll's House. His contemporary, Swedish novelist and playwright August Strindberg, was a forerunner of experimental forms such as expressionism, symbolism and surrealism. Nobel prizes for literature have been awarded to Selma Lagerlöf, Verner von Heidenstam, Karl Adolph Gjellerup, Henrik Pontoppidan, Knut Hamsun, Sigrid Undset, Erik Axel Karlfeldt, Frans Eemil Sillanpää, Johannes Vilhelm Jensen, Pär Lagerkvist, Halldór Laxness, Nelly Sachs, Eyvind Johnson, Harry Martinson and Tomas Tranströmer. World-famous Nordic children's book writers include Hans Christian Andersen, Tove Jansson and Astrid Lindgren.

Since 1962, the Nordic Council has awarded a literature prize once a year for a work of fiction written in one of the Nordic languages. Since its establishment, the prize has been won by fifteen Swedish, ten Danish, ten Norwegian, eight Finnish, seven Icelandic, two Faroe and one Sami writers.

Nordic libraries function as information centres with a wide variety of services and access to all kinds of printed and electronic media. In the last twenty years, there has been an overall decline in stock and lending of books in public libraries. Despite the general decline in stock and loans, most of the Nordic countries have had an increase in the lending of other media than books. Since 2000, the stock of other media has increased between 30 and 85 per cent. The lending of books has at the same time decreased in all Nordic countries, a decline between 10 and 20 per cent.

=== Art ===
Examples of nordic art from the 19th century

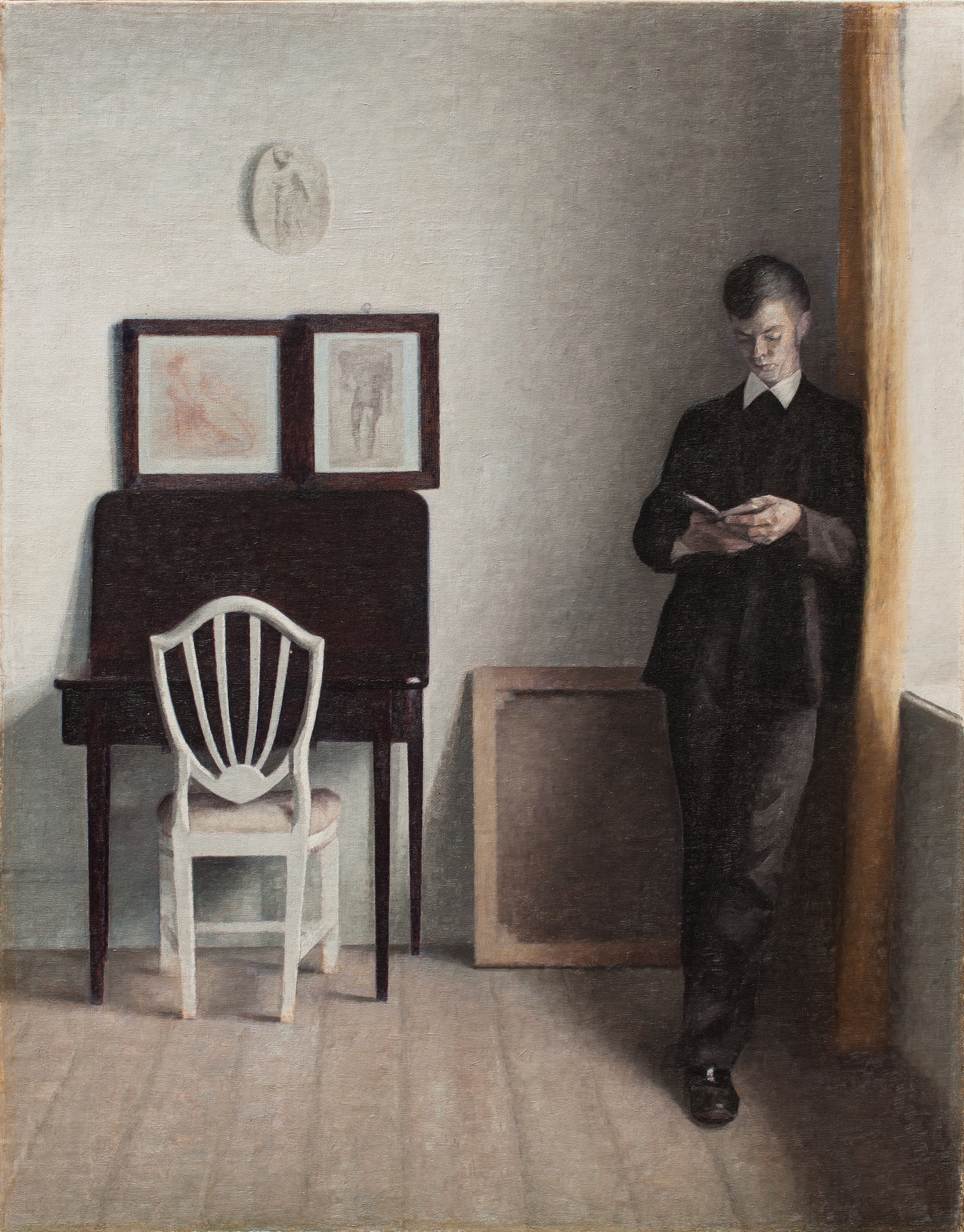
(Denmark) Vilhelm Hammershøi
(1864–1916)
Interior with Young Man Reading, 1898

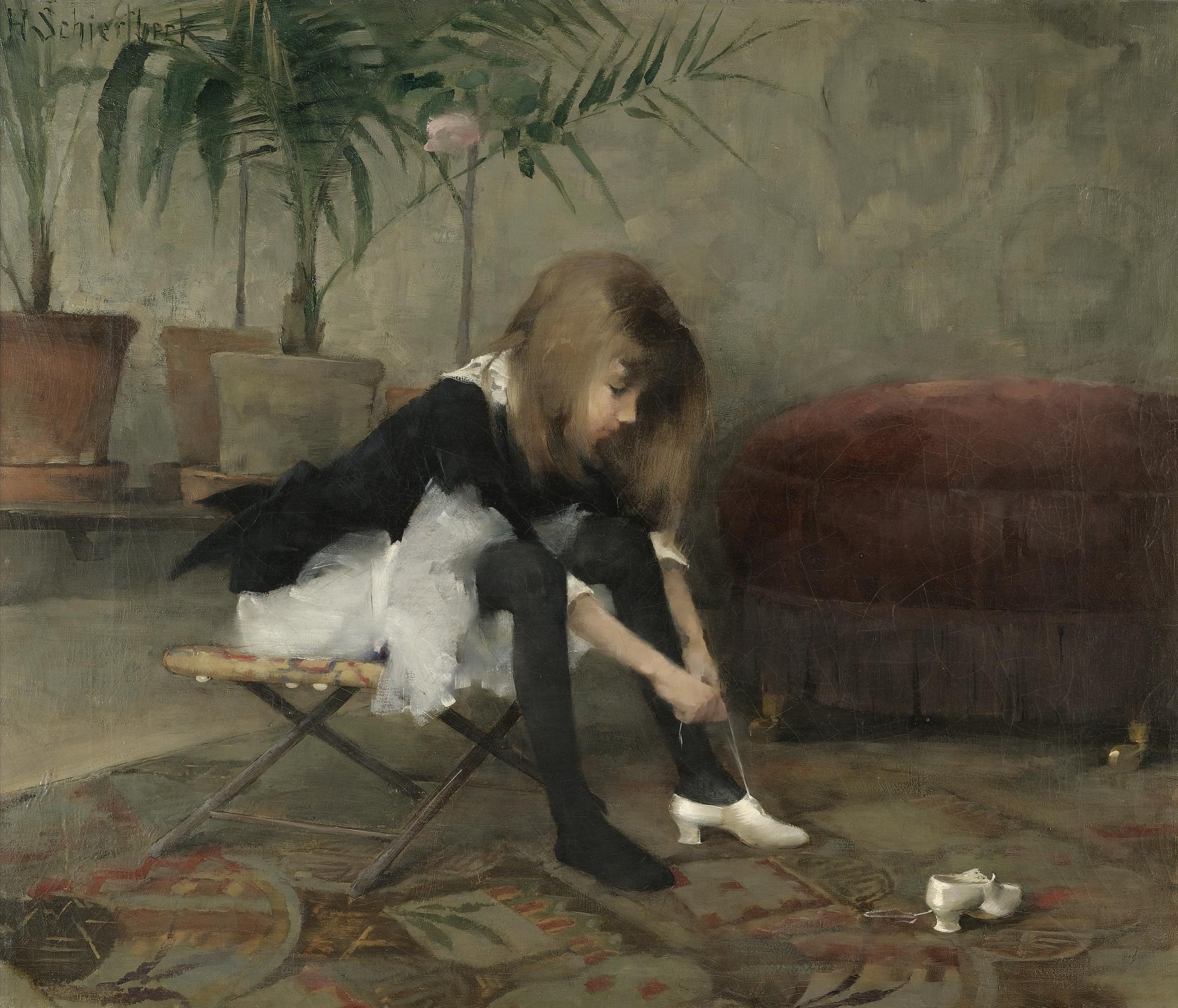
(Finland) Helene Schjerfbeck
(1862–1946)
Dancing Shoes, 1882

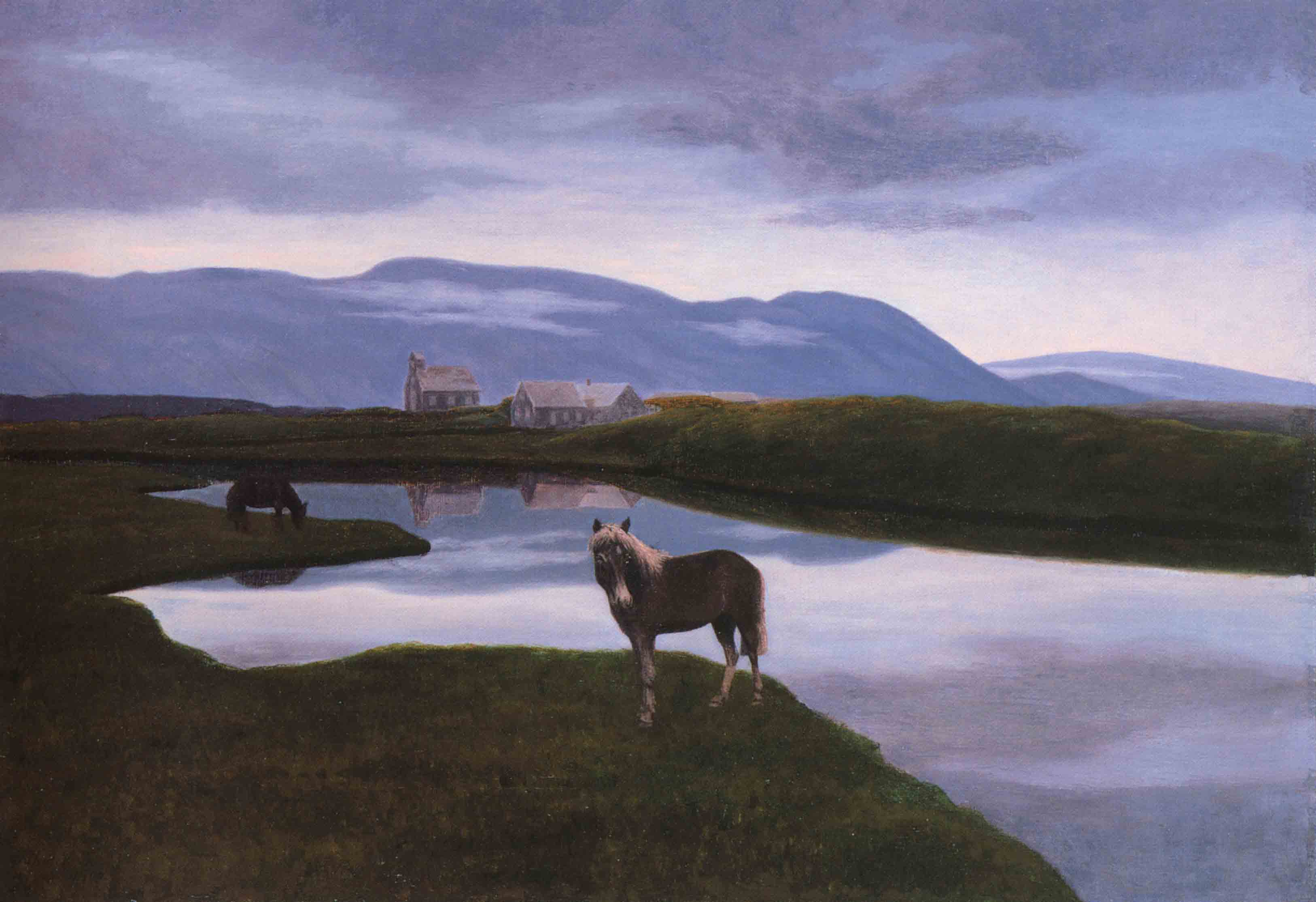
(Iceland) Þórarinn B. Þorláksson
(1867–1924)
Þingvellir, 1900

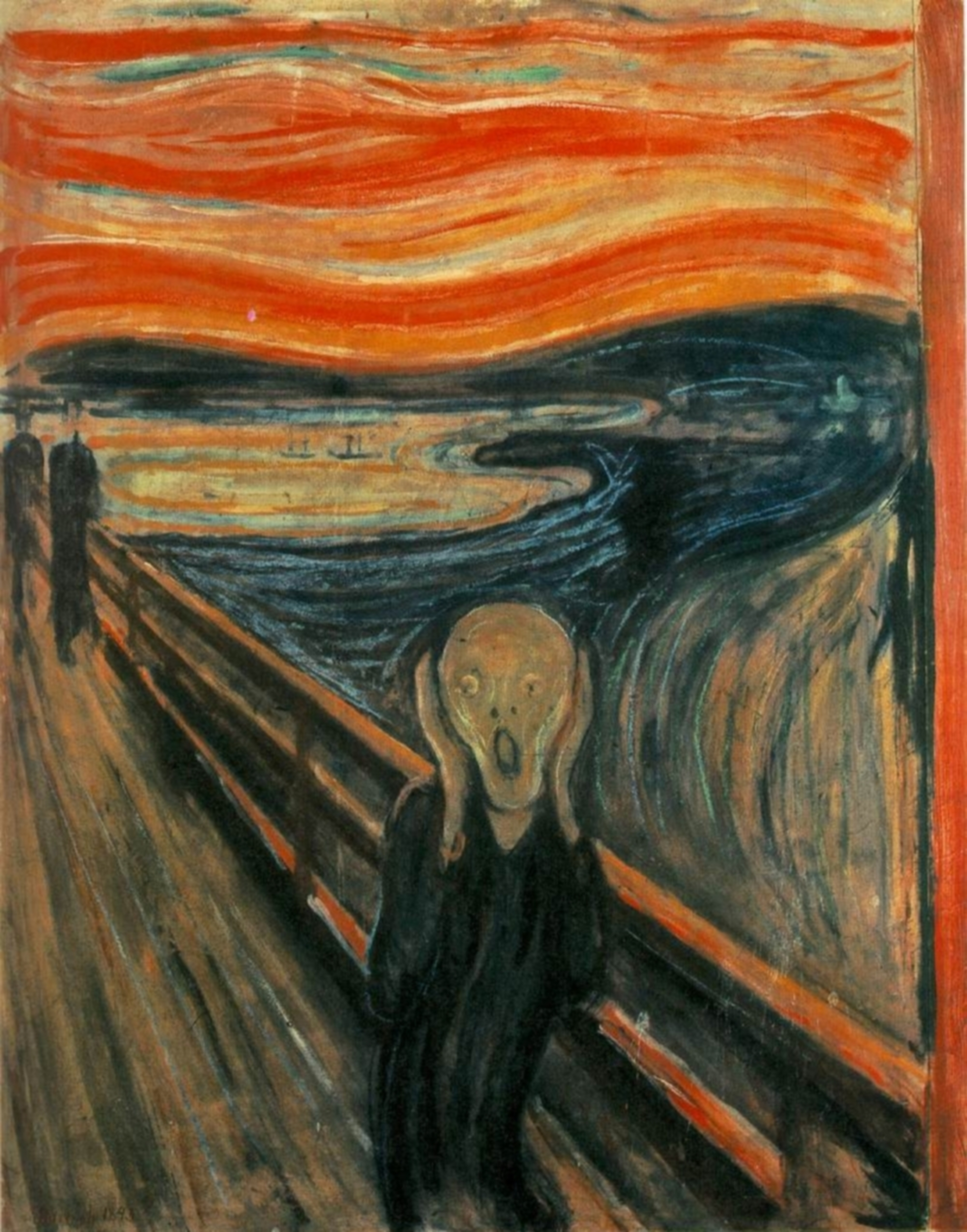
(Norway) Edvard Munch
(1863–1944)
The Scream, 1893

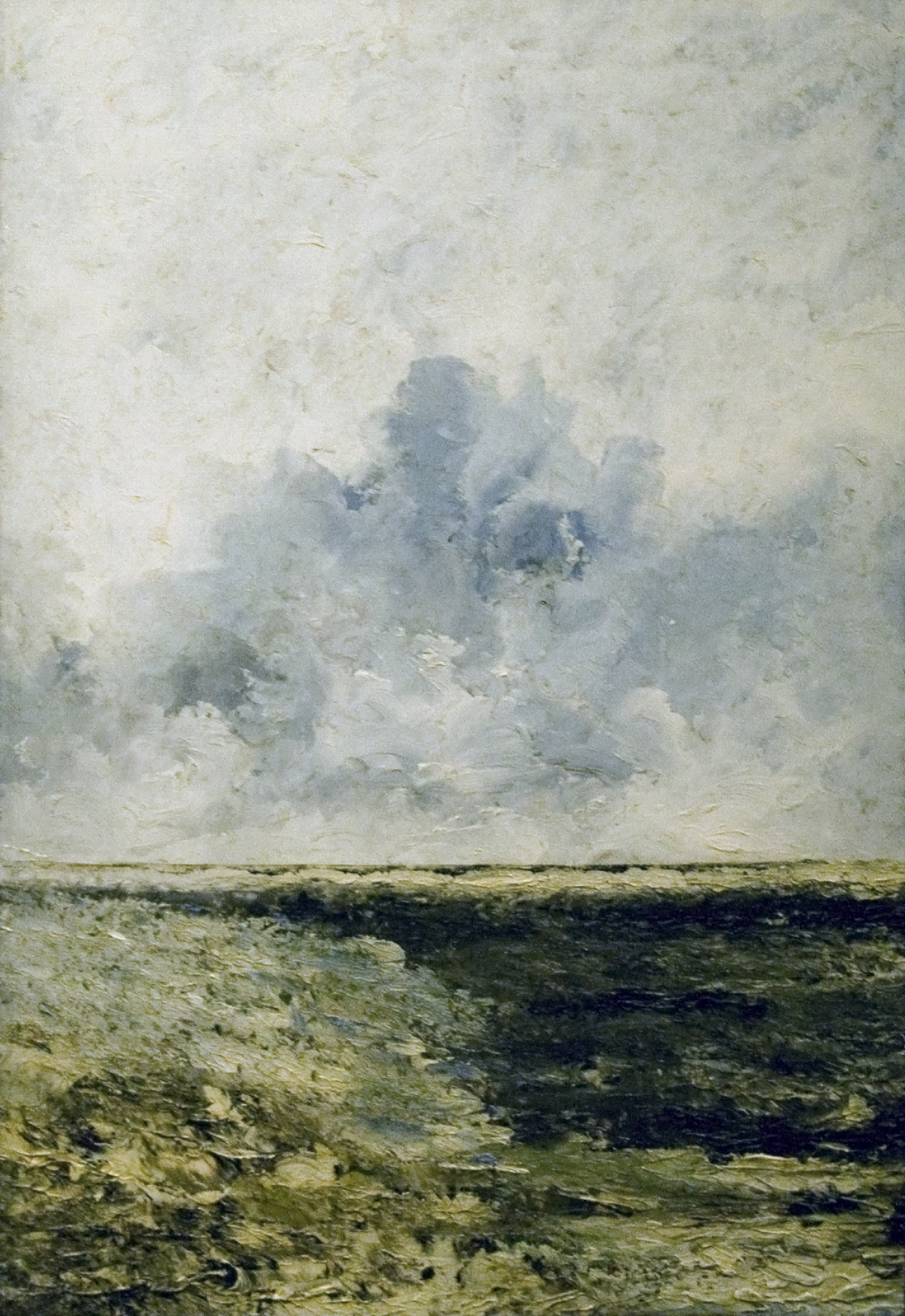
(Sweden) August Strindberg
(1849–1912)
Seascape, 1894

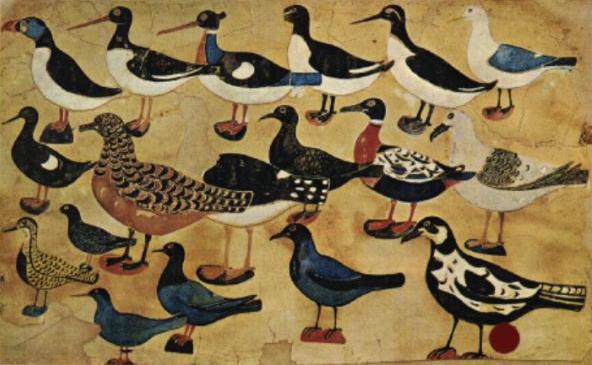
(Faroe Islands) Díðrikur á Skarvanesi
(1802–1865)
Birds, 1800s

== National symbols ==
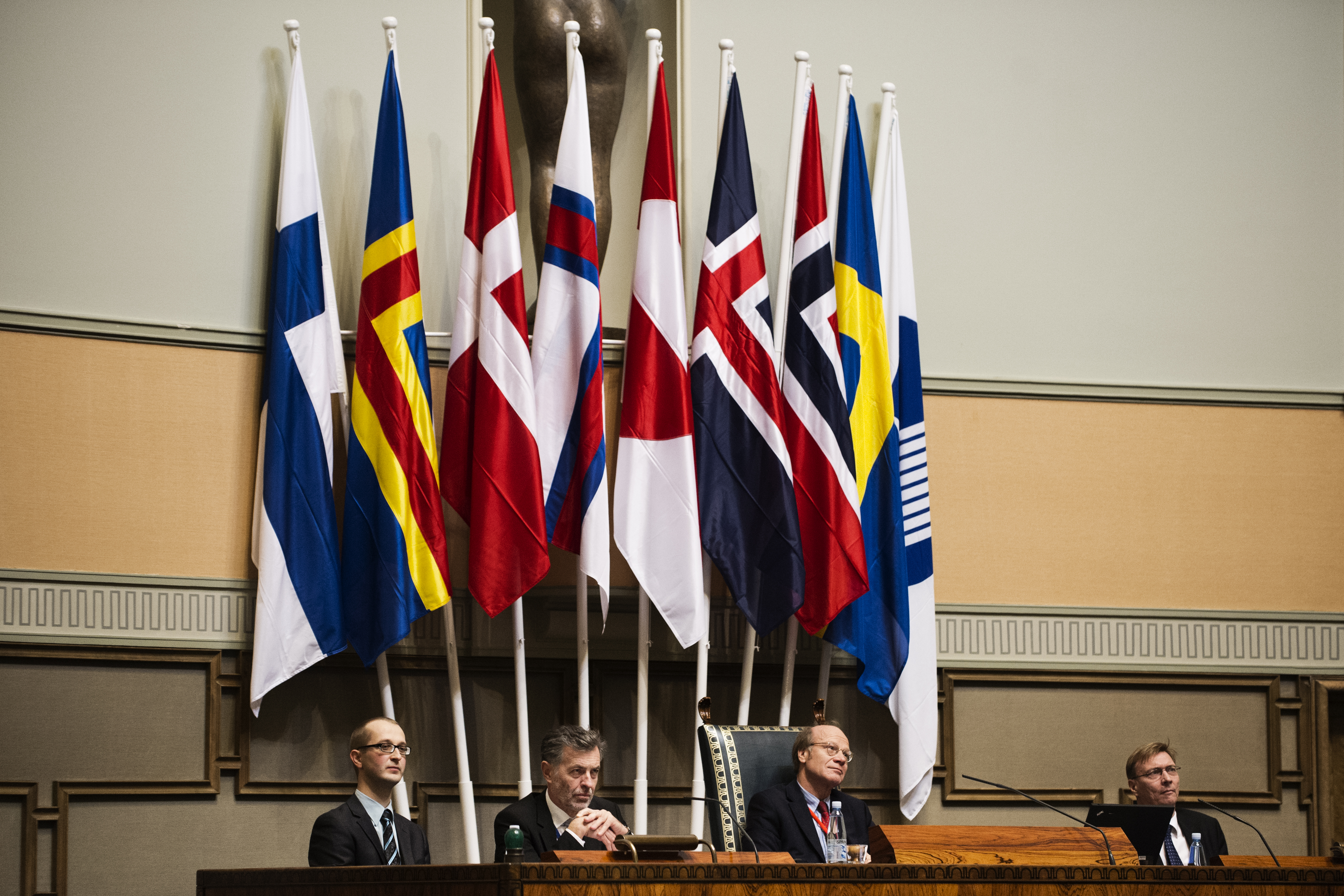
Flags of the Nordic countries, its territories, and the Nordic Council from left to right: Finland, Åland, Denmark, Faroe Islands, Greenland, Iceland, Norway, Sweden and the Nordic Council

The Nordic countries, including the autonomous territories of the Faroe Islands and Åland, have a similar flag design. They display an off-centre cross with the intersection closer to the hoist – the "Nordic cross" or "Scandinavian cross"– however each has a different aspect ratio. This cross design was first seen in the Dannebrog, the national flag of Denmark. Greenland and Sápmi have adopted flags without the Nordic cross, but they both feature a circle similarly placed off-centre representing the sun setting on the horizon.

== See also ==
=== Associated ===
- Climate of the Nordic countries
- Subdivisions of the Nordic countries
- Universal basic income in the Nordic countries
- Sport in the Nordic countries

=== Others ===
- Baltic region
- Baltoscandia
- British Isles
- Nordic-Baltic Eight
- Benelux
