= List of countries by irreligion =

Nonreligious population by country, 2010.

Irreligion, which may include deism, agnosticism, ignosticism, anti-religion, atheism, skepticism, ietsism, spiritual but not religious, freethought, anti-theism, apatheism, non-belief, pandeism, secular humanism, non-religious theism, pantheism, panentheism, and New Age, varies in the countries around the world.

The countries with the highest official unaffiliation are China at 93%, Vietnam at 86.32%, North Korea at 71.3%, Belgium at 59%, Estonia at 58%, South Korea at 56.1%, Netherlands at 55%, New Zealand at 51.6%, Czech Republic at 47.8%, Germany at 47%, Uruguay at 44.5%, Cuba at 44%, Japan at 42%, Mongolia at 40.6%, Australia at 38.9%, Luxembourg at 38%, United Kingdom at 37.2%, Switzerland at 36.8%, Finland at 35.9%, Sweden at 34.8%, Canada at 34.6%, France at 33%, Latvia at 30.6%, United States at 28%, Spain and Taiwan at 27%, and Chile at 25.8%.

According to reports from the WIN/Gallup International's (WIN/GIA) four global polls: in 2005, 77% were a religious person and 4% were "convinced atheists"; in 2012, 23% were not a religious person and 13% were "convinced atheists"; in 2015, 22% were not a religious person and 11% were "convinced atheists"; and in 2017, 25% were not a religious person and 9% were "convinced atheists". In 2025, 55% identified themselves as religious, while 30% were not religious, and 10% declared themselves "convinced atheists".

In 2010, the religiously unaffiliated numbered 1.1 billion (about one-in-six people or 16% of the 6.9 billion population at the time), according to Pew Research Center. This "include atheists, agnostics and people who do not identify with any particular religion in surveys"; of that overall category, many may still hold some religious beliefs and some engage in religious practices as well. The figure in 2020 was 1.9 billion being religiously unaffiliated, which represented 24.2% of the world population.

In 2006, according to sociologist Phil Zuckerman, broad estimates of those who have an absence of belief in a god range from 500 to 750 million people worldwide. According to sociologists Ariela Keysar and Juhem Navarro-Rivera's 2013 review of numerous global studies on atheism, there are 450 to 500 million positive atheists and agnostics worldwide (7% of the world's population) with China alone accounting for 200 million of that demographic. In 2004, relative to its own populations, Zuckerman ranks the top 5 countries with the highest possible ranges of agnostics and atheists: Sweden (46–85%), Vietnam (81%), Denmark (43–80%), Norway (31–72%), and Japan (64–65%).

A 2023 Gallup International survey found that Sweden was the country with the highest percentage of citizens that stated they do not believe in a god.

In 2020, the majority (78%) of the global nonreligious or unaffiliated demographic resided in Asia-Pacific. China alone makes up 67% of the global religiously unaffiliated demographic. Many of the global religiously unaffiliated demographic still have some religious beliefs and participate in religious practices.

== Differences in questions asked in polls ==
Each poll uses different questions and methods:-

- The WIN/Gallup International poll asked "Irrespective of whether you attend a place of worship or not, would you say that you are a religious person, not a religious person or a convinced atheist?"
- Dentsu Communication Institute provides data for respondents who stated that they have "no religion".
- Phil Zuckerman uses only the number of people who describe themselves as atheists and agnostics.

The numbers come from different years, and might not be accurate for countries with governments that require or urge religion or secularism.

== Countries and regions ==
The Pew Research Center data in the table below reflects "religiously unaffiliated" in 2010 which "include atheists, agnostics and people who do not identify with any particular religion in surveys".

The WIN/Gallup International poll results below are the totals for "not a religious person" (regardless of whether they had some religious affiliation or belief) and "a convinced atheist" combined, but not "Do not know/No response". In 2013, Keysar, et al., have advised caution with past WIN/Gallup International figures since more extensive surveys have consistently reached lower figures than the numbers in the table below. For example, the WIN/GIA numbers from China were overestimated which in turn inflated global totals.

The Zuckerman data on the table below only reflect the number of people who have an absence of belief in a deity only (atheists, agnostics). These do not include the broader number of people who do not identify with a religion, such as deists, pantheists, and spiritual-but-not-religious people.

	Pew	WIN/GIA			Dentsu	Zuckerman	Last census or estimation data		
Country or region	(2012)	(2017)	(2015)	(2012)	(2006)	(2004)	Percent (Note: Of the eligible population, excluding unknown answers such as "not declared", "no answers", "not found out", and "refused to answer")	Number	Year
Afghanistan (details)	< 0.1%		9%	15%					
Albania (details)	1.4%	39%				8%	20.6%	417,466 (Note: Included 85,311 atheists and 332,155 believers without denominations)	2023
Argentina	12.2%	20%	20%	26%	13%	4–8%			
Armenia	1.3%	6%	5%	5%		34%	0.5%	14,507	2022
Australia (details)	24.2%	63%	58%	58%		24–25%	41.9%	9,886,957	2021
Austria	13.5%	53%	54%	53%	12%	18–26%	22.3%	1,997,700	2021
Azerbaijan (details)	< 0.1%	64%	54%	51%					
Bangladesh (details)	< 0.1%	19%	5%						
Belarus	28.6%				48%	17%			
Belgium (details)	29%	64%	48%	34%	35%	42–43%			
Bosnia and Herzegovina	2.5%	22%	32%	29%			1.1%	38,669	2013
Brazil (details)	7.9%	17%	18%	14%			9.3%	16,385,342	2022
Bulgaria (details)	4.2%	39%	39%	30%	30%	34–40%	5.9%	305,102	2021
Cameroon	5.3%			17%					
Canada (details)	23.7%	57%	53%	49%	26%	19–30%	34.6%	12,577,495	2021
Chile	8.6%				34%				
China (details)	52.2%	90%	90%	77%	93%	8–14%			
Colombia	6.6%	14%	17%	15%					
DR Congo	1.8%	17%							
Croatia (details)	5.1%				13%	7%	6.6%	247,149	2021
Cuba	23%					7%			
Czech Republic (details)	76.4%	72%	75%	78%	64%	54–61%	68.3% (Note: <75% of responses were valid, interpret this with caution)	5,027,094	2021
Denmark (details)	11.8%	61%	52%		10%	43–80%			
Dominican Republic	10.9%					7%			
Ecuador	5.5%	18%	28%	29%					
Estonia (details)	59.6%	60%			76%	49%	67.0%	659,900	2021
Fiji	0.8%	8%	7%	6%			0.8%	7,073	2007
Finland (details)	17.6%	55%	42%	44%	12%	28–60%	34.9%	1,965,761	2024
France (details)	28%	50%	53%	63%	43%	43–54%			
Georgia (details)	0.7%		7%	13%			0.5%	19,080	2014
Germany (details)	24.7%	60%	59%	48%	25%	41–49%			
Ghana (details)	4.2%	1%		2%			1.1%	328,721	2021
Greece (details)	6.1%	22%	21%		4%	16%			
Hungary (details)	18.6%				43%	32–46%	26.9%	1,549,610	2022
Iceland (details)	3.5%	49%	44%	41%	4%	16–23%	7.8%	30,190	2025
India (details)	< 0.1%	5%	23%	16%	7%	9.11%		2,867,303	
Indonesia (details)	< 0.1%	30%	15%					132,881	
Iran (details)	0.1%	20%			1%				
Iraq (details)	0.1%	34%		9%					
Ireland (details)	6.2%	56%	51%	54%	7%		15.8%	759,370	2022
Israel (details)	3.1%	58%	65%			15–37%			
Italy (details)	12.4%	26%	24%	23%	18%	6–15%			
Japan (details)	57%	60%	62%	62%	52%	64–65%			
Kazakhstan (details)	4.2%					11–12%	2.8%	339,109	2021
Kenya (details)	2.5%		9%	11%			1.6%	755,750	2019
Kosovo	1.6%	3%	8%				0.5%	7,899	2024
Kyrgyzstan	0.4%					7%			
Latvia	43.8%	52%	50%		41%	20–29%			
Lebanon (details)	0.3%	28%	18%	35%					
Lithuania	10%	40%		23%	19%	13%	7.1%	171,810	2021
Luxembourg	26.8%				30%				
Malaysia	0.7%		23%	13%			0.8%	271,799	2020
Malta	2.5%				1%		5.1%	23,243	2021
Mexico (details)	4.7%	36%	28%				10.6%	13,314,516 (Note: Included 9,488,671 people without religions, a further 722,381 people classified as atheists/agnostics, and another 3,103,464 people identified as believers without denominations.)	2020
Moldova	1.4%			10%			0.2%	5,942	2014
Mongolia	35.9%	29%				9%	38.6%	735,686	2010
Morocco (details)	< 0.1%		5%						
Netherlands (details)	42.1%		66%	56%	55%	39–44%			
New Zealand (details)	36.6%					20–22%	51.6%	2,576,049	2023
Nigeria (details)	0.4%	2%	16%	5%	1%				
North Korea	71.3%					15%			
North Macedonia		11%	10%	9%			0.5%	8,764	2021
Norway (details)	10.1%	62%				31–72%	24.2%	1,343,726	2024
Pakistan (details)	< 0.1%	6%	11%	10%				36,881	
Palestinian territories	< 0.1%	35%	19%	33%					
Panama	4.8%	13%							
Papua New Guinea	< 0.1%	5%	4%						
Peru (details)	3%	23%	13%	11%	5%		5.1%	1,180,361	2017
Philippines (details)	0.1%	9%	22%		11%		0.04%	43,931	2020
Poland (details)	5.6%	10%	12%	14%	5%		8.6%	2,611,506	2021
Portugal	4.4%	38%	37%		11%	4–9%	14.1%	1,237,130	2021
Puerto Rico	1.9%				11%				
Romania (details)	0.1%	9%	17%	7%	2%		0.9%	154,144	2021
Russia (details)	16.2%	30%	23%	32%	48%	24–48%			
Saudi Arabia (details)	0.7%			24%					
Serbia	3.3%	21%	21%	19%			1.4%	82,793	2022
Singapore (details)	16.4%					13%	20.0%	692,528	2020
Slovakia	14.3%				23%	10–28%	25.4%	1,296,142	2021
Slovenia	18%	53%			30%	35–38%			
South Africa (details)	14.9%			32%	11%		3.1%	1,895,416	2022
South Korea (details)	46.4%	60%	55%	46%	37%	30–52%			
South Sudan	1%			16%					
Spain (details)	19%	57%	55%	47%	16%	15–24%			
Sweden (details)	27%	73%	76%	58%	25%	46–85%			
Switzerland (details)	11.9%		58%	47%		17–27%	36.8%		2024
Taiwan	12.7%					24%			
Tanzania	1.4%				2%				
Thailand	0.3%	2%	2%				0.003%	2,082	2018
Tunisia	0.2%			33%					
Turkey (details)	1.2%	12%	15%	75%	3%				
Uganda (details)	0.5%				1%		0.2%	85,559	2024
Ukraine	14.7%	42%	24%	23%	42%	20%			
United Kingdom (details)	21.3%	69%	66%			31–44%	40.1%	25,273,495	2021
United States (details)	16.4%	39%	39%	35%	20%	3–9%			
Uruguay (details)	40.7%					12%			
Uzbekistan	0.8%			18%					
Venezuela	10%		2%		27%				
Vietnam	29.6%	63%	54%	65%	46%	81%	86.3%	83,046,105	2019

== By population ==
The Pew Research Center in the table below reflects "religiously unaffiliated" which "include atheists, agnostics and people who do not identify with any particular religion in surveys".

The Zuckerman data on the table below only reflect the number of people who have an absence of belief in a deity only (atheists, agnostics). Does not include the broader number of people who do not identify with a religion such as deists, spiritual but not religious, pantheists, New Age spiritualism, etc.

Country	Pew (2012)	Zuckerman (2004)
China	700,680,000	103,907,840 – 181,838,720
India		102,870,000
Japan	72,120,000	81,493,120 – 82,766,450
Vietnam	26,040,000	66,978,900
Russia	23,180,000	34,507,680 – 69,015,360
Germany	20,350,000	33,794,250 – 40,388,250
France	17,580,000	25,982,320 – 32,628,960
United Kingdom		18,684,010 – 26,519,240
South Korea	22,350,000	14,579,400 – 25,270,960
Ukraine		9,546,400
United States	50,980,000	8,790,840 – 26,822,520
Netherlands		6,364,020 – 7,179,920
Canada		6,176,520 – 9,752,400
Spain		6,042,150 – 9,667,440
Taiwan		5,460,000
Hong Kong		5,240,000
Czech Republic		5,328,940 – 6,250,121
Australia		4,779,120 – 4,978,250
Belgium		4,346,160 – 4,449,640
Sweden		4,133,560 – 7,638,100
Italy		3,483,420 – 8,708,550
North Korea	17,350,000	3,404,700
Hungary		3,210,240 – 4,614,720
Bulgaria		2,556,120 – 3,007,200
Denmark		2,327,590 – 4,330,400
Turkey		1,956,990 - 6,320,550
Belarus		1,752,870
Greece		1,703,680
Kazakhstan		1,665,840 – 1,817,280
Argentina		1,565,800 – 3,131,600
Austria		1,471,500 – 2,125,500
Finland		1,460,200 – 3,129,000
Norway		1,418,250 – 3,294,000
Switzerland		1,266,670 – 2,011,770
Israel		929,850 – 2,293,630
New Zealand		798,800 – 878,680
Cuba		791,630
Slovenia		703,850 – 764,180
Estonia		657,580
Dominican Republic		618,380
Singapore		566,020
Slovakia		542,400 – 1,518,720
Lithuania		469,040
Latvia		461,200 – 668,740
Portugal		420,960 – 947,160
Armenia		118,740
Uruguay		407,880
Kyrgyzstan		355,670
Croatia		314,790
Albania		283,600
Mongolia		247,590
Iceland		47,040 – 67,620
Brazil	15,410,000	

== See also ==
- Demographics of atheism
- Importance of religion by country
- List of religious populations
