= Irreligion in Sweden =

Religious affiliation in Sweden (2019)
1. Lutheranism (56.4%)
2. Other Protestants (3.40%)
3. Orthodoxy (1.70%)
4. Catholicism (1.20%)
5. Other Christian (0.30%)
6. Islam (1.90%)
7. Other Religions (0.30%)
8. Unaffiliated (34.8%)

Irreligion is common in Sweden, and Sweden is one of the most secular nations in the world. The majority of Swedish citizens are registered members of the Church of Sweden, but very few are practicing members. Sweden has legally been a secular state since 2000 when the Church of Sweden was separated from the state.

== History ==
Viktor Lennstrand was cited as one of the founders of Freethought in Sweden after he was imprisoned several times in the 1880s and 1890s for blasphemy. During the 1960s, debate took place over the role of religion in Swedish society. Herbert Tingsten, Ingemar Hedenius, and Gunnar Heckscher were notable irreligious voices at the time. Humanists Sweden was founded in 1979 and is currently the largest humanist organization in Sweden.

The Swedish government has passed several secular reforms over the years: a legal opt-out of the previously mandatory membership of the Swedish church was allowed in 1951; automatic membership by birth with at least one parent member in the Church of Sweden ─ the organization's enrollment practice since the 1850s ─ ended in 1996; and the Church of Sweden was formally separated from the state on 1 January 2000, leaving Sweden as, at the time, "the only Nordic country without a state church".

== Demographics ==
Sweden is considered one of the world's most secular nations, with a high proportion of irreligious people. Phil Zuckerman, an associate professor of Sociology at Pitzer College, writes that several academic sources have in recent years placed atheism rates in Sweden between 46% and 85%, with one source reporting that only 17% of respondents self-identified as "atheist". Gallup Poll found in 2016 that 18% of Swedes self-report as atheist and 55% as non-religious.

Sweden's official website says that just three out of 10 Swedes state that they have confidence in the church. According to the site, only one in ten Swedes thinks religion is important in daily life or has trust in a religious leader. The Church of Sweden states that under 5 out of 10 children are christened in the church, around 1 out of 3 weddings take place in church, and around 3 out of 4 Swedes have Christian burials.

Of the 70% of the population who are members of the Church of Sweden, about 6% "are active churchgoers attending services at least once a month". Many of the Swedes that attend church do it due to traditional or cultural reasons, but are otherwise not practicing Christians: according to a 2010 membership survey, 15% of Church of Sweden members say they are atheists, while 25% identify themselves as agnostic. The younger the members, the more likely they are to be atheists or agnostics. Also, the same poll found that 90% of church members have a weak relationship with the Swedish Church, and that only 15% of them believe in Jesus.

In 2018, it was reported by Pew Research Centre that 36% of adults in Sweden believe in some kind of god, higher power or spiritual force (of those 14% believe it is specifically the one from the Bible), while 60% stated that they do not believe in a god. Other findings were that 72% said religion is not important in their lives, and 62% of Swedes said they never pray.

== See also ==
- Demographics of Sweden
- Religion in Sweden
