= Irreligion in Italy =

Religion in Italy according to the Global Religious Landscape survey by the Pew Forum, 2012
1. Christianity (83.3%)
2. No religion (12.4%)
3. Islam (3.70%)
4. Buddhism (0.30%)
5. Hinduism (0.10%)
6. Other religions (0.20%)

Irreligion in Italy includes all citizens of Italy that are atheist, agnostic, or otherwise irreligious. Approximately 12.4% of Italians were irreligious according to 2012 Pew Forum, and no affiliation is the second most common religious demographic in Italy after Christianity. Freedom of religion in Italy was guaranteed by the Constitution of Italy following its enactment in 1948. Until then, the Catholic Church was the official state church of Italy. The latest data in 2020, from a large study financed by the Italian Catholic Bishops Conference, concluded that 30% of the population was atheist, being around 18 million people. Moreover, back in 2019 attendance was at 37%, but in 2023 regular Church and mass attendance dropped to 18.8%, which represented 11.28 million Italians, and other research in 2024 showed only 15.3% were regular churchgoers.

Pew Research Center's 2025 report on global religious switching, discovered that in Europe, Italy leads for those who leave their childhood religion at 28.4 who left for every 1.0 that has joined. A study by CENSIS, an Italian institute of sociological research, discovered that amongst the 71.4% of religious adherents, 20.9% of them identified as "non-practicing Catholics".

== History ==
The earliest recorded accounts of atheism in Italy was in the 1550s. 15th century Italy was prominently written about as a breeding ground for Atheism. During the Italian Renaissance, Italy became a major hub of early secular philosophy.

In a letter to John Calvin, Italian theologian Lelio Sozzini wrote: "Most of my friends are so well educated they can scarcely believe God exists."

Roger Ascham in 1551 wrote about his experience in Italy: "A man may freely discourse against what he will, against whom he lust, against any prince, against any government, yes against God himself, and his whole religion".

Gui Patin in the 17th century described Italy in reference to religion as the land of "pox, poisoning, and atheism".

Lucilio Vanini represented an early voice in Italian secularism. Vanini became a Carmelite Friar in 1603. Vanini sought refuge secretly with the English ambassador to Venice in 1612. While in England, he publicly renounced Catholicism with the writing of two books about naturalistic philosophy. Vanini's idea of naturalistic philosophy was that the world is eternal and governed by immanent laws. In this time, Vanini wrote two books: Aversus veteres philosophos in 1615, and De Admirandis Naturae Reginae Deaeque Mortalium Arcanis in 1616. The ideas in Vanini's books caused controversy in Italy with the Catholic Church, and he was accused of atheism. For the accusation of atheism, he was condemned. In 1619, known under the pseudonym Pompeo Uciglio, he was executed in Toulouse. The Venetian Holy Inquisition sought to challenge irreligion during this time.

Other irreligious Italian philosophers such as Giuseppe Rensi were critical of religion later in the 20th century.

== Prominent Italian irreligious historical figures ==
=== Politicians ===
- Enrico Berlinguer – secretary of the Communist party
- Fausto Bertinotti – former president of the Chamber of Deputies
- Massimo D'Alema – former prime minister of Italy
- Gianfranco Fini – former president of the Chamber of Deputies
- Pietro Ingrao – former president of the Chamber of Deputies
- Nilde Iotti – former president of the Chamber of Deputies
- Benito Mussolini – former prime minister of Italy and leader of the National Fascist Party
- Cesare Merzagora – former president of the Senate of the Republic
- Giorgio Napolitano – former president of Italy
- Pietro Nenni – secretary of the Socialist party
- Marcello Pera – former president of the Senate
- Sandro Pertini – former president of Italy and president of the Chamber of Deputies
- Giovanni Spadolini – former prime minister of Italy and president of the Senate

=== Artists ===
- Giacomo Manzù – created the doors of St. Peter's Basilica in Vatican City

=== Scholars ===
- Alessandro Barbero – historian
- Margherita Hack – astrophysicist
- Piergiorgio Odifreddi – mathematician and writer
- Carlo Rovelli – physicist

=== Writers ===
- Primo Levi – Holocaust survivor, author of If this is a man
- Pier Paolo Pasolini – poet, writer and film director

=== All notable figures ===
- Italy has had many notable figures who identify or have identified as atheist or irreligious.
- For full list, see main article: Italian atheists.

== Current demographics ==
Around 11.5-13% of the population in Italy are religiously unaffiliated. The Global Religious Futures project predicts this number to grow to 16.3% by 2050, despite the unaffiliated group having a slightly lower fertility rate than the religious ones. Using a less direct definition, the WIN/GIA Global Index of Religiosity and Atheism survey found that 23% of the population was "not a religious person" in 2012, which grew to 26% by 2017. While a recent 2020 study by sociologist Francesco Garelli concluded that 30% of the Italian population was atheist or non-religious.

About 96% of all Italians are baptized into the Catholic Church which impacts religious identification, births, marriage, and funerals. Though the importance of religion has declined amongst the younger generation of Italians in the 21st century.

== See also ==
- Atheism
- CICAP
- Catholic Church in Italy
- Demographics of Italy
- Religion in Italy
- Union of Rationalist Atheists and Agnostics
