= Irreligion in Iceland =

The percentage of the Icelandic population registered as outside religious organizations.

Irreligion in Iceland is prevalent, with approximately 10% of the population identifying as "convinced atheists" and a further 30% identifying as not religious according to a 2012 report. Since the 20th century, irreligion has seen steady growth over the years.

== Freedom of religion ==
From the 16th century to the 19th century, religious life in Iceland was organized around the Evangelical Lutheran Church of Iceland, with compulsory membership. This started to change in 1874, when Iceland was given a constitution which granted freedom of religion and freedom of speech, opening the door for criticism of the church.

== Criticism by realists and socialists ==
Stephan G. Stephansson (1853–1927), atheist poet

With the publication of Verðandi in 1882, literary realism started making inroads into Icelandic culture. Realist writers like Gestur Pálsson, Einar Hjörleifsson Kvaran and Þorsteinn Erlingsson criticized church authorities, blind religious fervour and Christian hypocrisy. The poet Stephan G. Stephansson went furthest in explicitly declaring himself an atheist.

Socialist writers of the early 20th century continued criticism in a similar vein. In 1924, Þórbergur Þórðarson published Bréf til Láru ("A Letter to Laura"). Among other provocative content, the book contained an attack on Christianity. The book provoked outrage from intellectuals and clergymen. In the 1920s and 1930s, labour leader Pjetur G. Guðmundsson published translations of faith-critical works by Robert G. Ingersoll as well as some of his own thoughts.

== Níels Dungal ==
The most ambitious atheistic work composed in 20th century Iceland was Blekking og þekking ("Deception and Knowledge"), a book by Níels P. Dungal published in 1948. Dungal was a professor of medicine at the University of Iceland and for some years the rector of the university. His atheistic criticism differed from much of previous atheistic writings in Iceland in not being a part of a wider political program. The book, a tome of 540 pages, chronicles what Dungal saw as the historical conflict between religion and church authority ("Deception") on one hand and science and true progress ("Knowledge") on the other hand.

The work was advertised as a book that would "cause more severe disputes than any other book published for many years". To some extent the book lived up to this claim, provoking lengthy critical reviews by theologians, including one by Sigurbjörn Einarsson, later bishop. The same year another medical doctor published a pro-Christian book, advertised as a counterpoint to Dungal's book. In 1950, Níels Dungal and Sigurbjörn Einarsson had a public debate on the topic of religion and science.

== Helgi Hóseasson ==
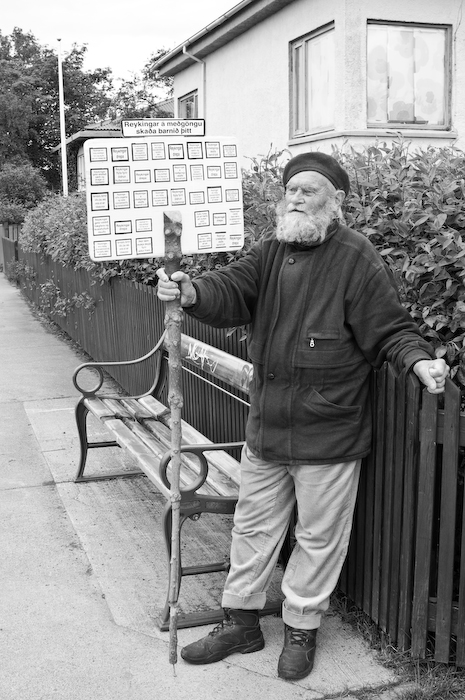
Helgi Hóseasson (b. 1919, d. 2009), atheist activist

Atheist activism in Iceland begins with Helgi Hóseasson (b. 1919, d. 2009), a carpenter and a socialist. In 1962, he started a campaign to get his baptismal covenant annulled. At first he sought recourse from Bishop Sigurbjörn Einarsson who told him that the baptismal covenant was permanent and could not be annulled. Helgi then contacted several other clergymen without getting results to his liking. He then sought legal recourse, pursuing the case through the Icelandic court system and finally appealing to the European Court of Human Rights, all without success. At this point Helgi believed that the only course remaining open to him was direct action. On October 16, 1966, he attended service at the Reykjavík Cathedral. Helgi went to the altar as if to receive communion but instead of consuming the wine and the bread he threw both items into a trash bag and then addressed the congregation, declaring his baptismal covenant annulled and "protesting the hatred of humanity which is the basis of the accursed Christian religion".

After the event at the cathedral, Helgi's quest turned towards getting Statistics Iceland to register the annulment of his baptismal covenant. It quickly became apparent that this was a wish the relevant authorities were not inclined to grant. Helgi then started a campaign of protests and disruptions of church services. In 1972, he decided the time had come for more decisive action. On October 10, the Althing came into session with a traditional procession of members of parliament, the president of the republic, and the bishop of Iceland to the Reykjavík cathedral. Helgi approached the procession and showered it with skyr. He succeeded in getting skyr on most members of parliament before being stopped by the police. The action succeeded in getting Helgi national attention and arousing some sympathy for his cause.

Later actions by Helgi included sprinkling tar on Stjórnarráðshúsið, the seat of government, in 1974, breaking windows in the same building in 1976, and sprinkling a chemical mixture on the same building in 1981. In 1982 he was implicated in burning down the church he had received confirmation in. Despite his decades-long campaign and frequent arrests, Helgi was never charged with anything.

== Contemporary Iceland ==
Although 89.3% of Icelanders are officially registered members of Christian congregations, church attendance in Iceland is low. Some 10% of Icelanders attend church once a month or more frequently, whereas 43% say that they never attend church and 15.9% say they attend church only once a year. In a 2004 survey, 69.3% of Icelanders said they were religious, whereas 19.1% said they were not religious and 11.6% said they could not say whether or not they were religious. Moreover, when asked to select a statement that best represented their opinion, 19.7% said that it is impossible to know whether or not god exists and 26.2% said that no god exists except man made gods. This would indicate that numbers of agnostics and atheists in Iceland are significantly higher than official registration of religious affiliation would indicate.

Iceland was one of the most irreligious countries in the world accord to Gallup. A Gallup poll conducted in 2012 found that 57% of Icelanders considered themselves "a religious person", 31% consider themselves "a non religious person", while 10% define themselves as "a convinced atheist", placing Iceland in the top 10 atheist populations in the world.

The 2023 survey by University of Iceland's Social Science Institute, found the majority of Icelanders reported religion was not important in their daily lives.

In 2025, around 62% of Icelanders were still registered under the Church of Iceland and other Lutheran churches, 28% were unaffiliated with any religious organization, 3% were under the Catholic Church, 1% under other Christian denominations, 1% were members of Asatru pagan folk communities, 1% under humanist institutions, and the remainder were affiliated with Buddhist, Islamic, and Zuist groups. By actual belief, around 40% of Icelanders said they believed in at least some religious faith system, while with young adults that number is 29%.

== Religious organisation unaffiliation ==
Unaffiliated (1 January)
Year	Population	Unaffiliated	%	±
1998	272,381	5,591	2.05	0.00
1999	275,712	5,767	2.09	0.04 ▲
2000	279,049	5,996	2.15	0.06 ▲
2001	283,361	6,367	2.25	0.10 ▲
2002	286,575	6,585	2.30	0.05 ▲
2003	288,471	6,713	2.33	0.03 ▲
2004	290,570	6,941	2.39	0.06 ▲
2005	293,577	7,152	2.44	0.05 ▲
2006	299,891	7,418	2.47	0.04 ▲
2007	307,672	8,011	2.60	0.13 ▲
2008	315,459	8,787	2.79	0.18 ▲
2009	319,368	9,309	2.91	0.13 ▲
2010	317,630	10,336	3.25	0.34 ▲

Unaffiliated (1 January)
Year	Population	Unaffiliated	%	±
2011	318,452	14,091	4.42	1.17 ▲
2012	319,575	15,802	4.94	0.52 ▲
2013	321,857	16,608	5.20	0.26 ▲
2014	325,671	17,218	5.29	0.09 ▲
2015	329,100	18,458	5.61	0.32 ▲
2016	332,529	19,202	5.77	0.16 ▲
2017	338,349	20,500	6.06	0.29 ▲
2018	348,580	23,318	6.69	0.63 ▲
2019	356,991	24,864	6.96	0.27 ▲
2020	364,134	26,114	7.17	0.21 ▲
2021	368,792	27,919	7.57	0.40 ▲
2022	376,248	29,203	7.76	0.19 ▲
