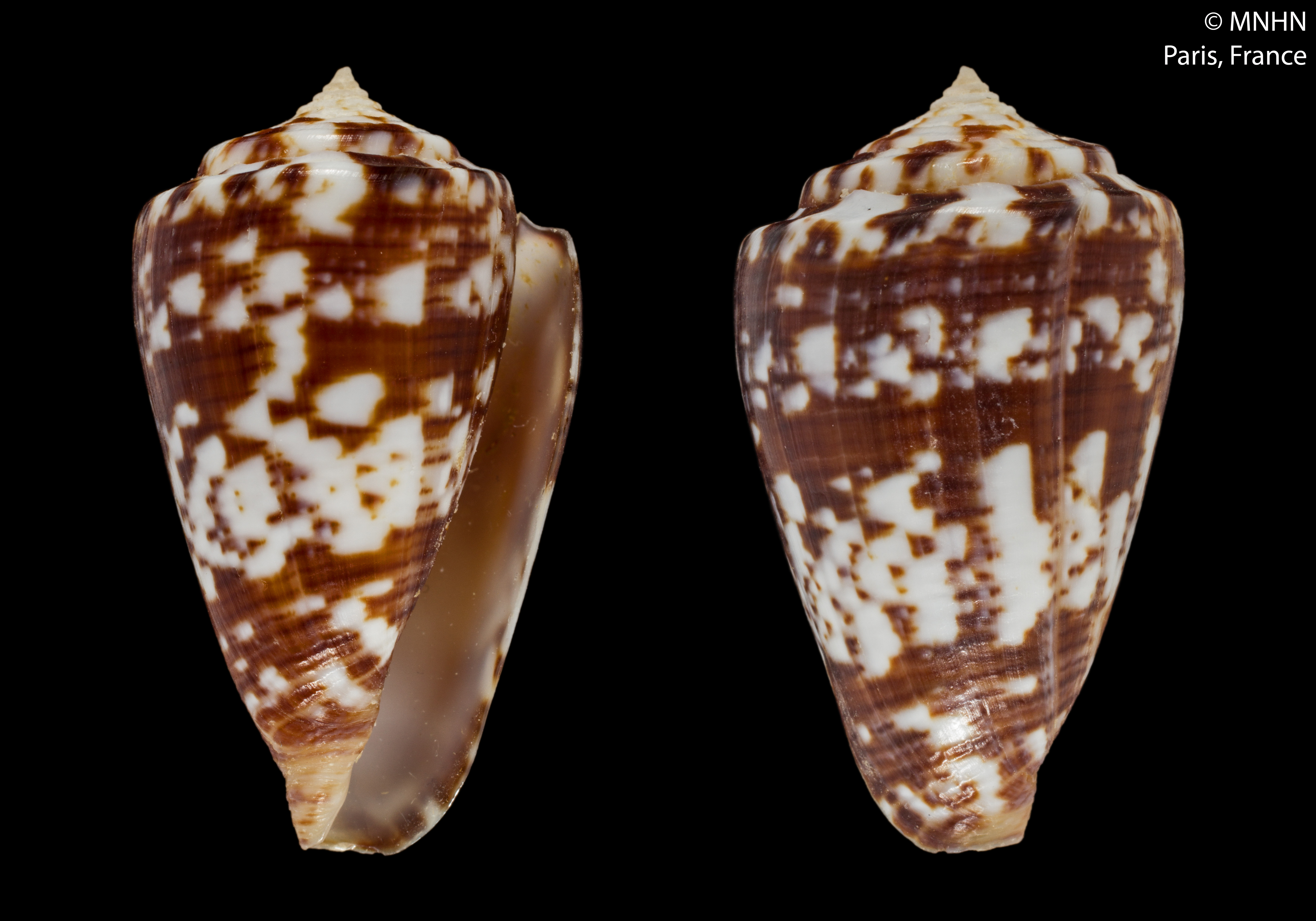
- Shell of Conus marimaris (paratype at MNHN, Paris)

Scientific classification
- Kingdom: Animalia
- Phylum: Mollusca
- Class: Gastropoda
- Subclass: Caenogastropoda
- Order: Neogastropoda
- Superfamily: Conoidea
- Family: Conidae
- Genus: Conus
- Species: C. marimaris

Binomial name
- Conus marimaris (Tenorio, Abalde & Zardoya, 2018)

Synonyms
- Conus (Kalloconus) marimaris (Tenorio, Abalde & Zardoya, 2018); Kalloconus marimaris Tenorio, Abalde & Zardoya, 2018

= Conus marimaris =

Species of gastropod

Conus marimaris is a species of sea snail, a marine gastropod mollusk, in the family Conidae, the cone snails and their allies.

== Description ==
The shell is small to medium size, varying between 25 and 35.3 mm, with a broad, slightly bulging or conical shape. The spire of the shell is moderate height, often worn down, and has a straight or curved shaped. Most shells are brown with small, white triangular markings, but in some morphs background colour is variable with yellow, orange, or white. The living animal is light purple colour with areas of dark purple.

== Distribution ==
Endemic to Sal Island, Cape Verdes, Africa. Two isolated populations displaying morphological differences in shell patterns have been identified: one located on the east and the other one the west of Sal Island.
