= Irreligion in Canada =

Irreligious community

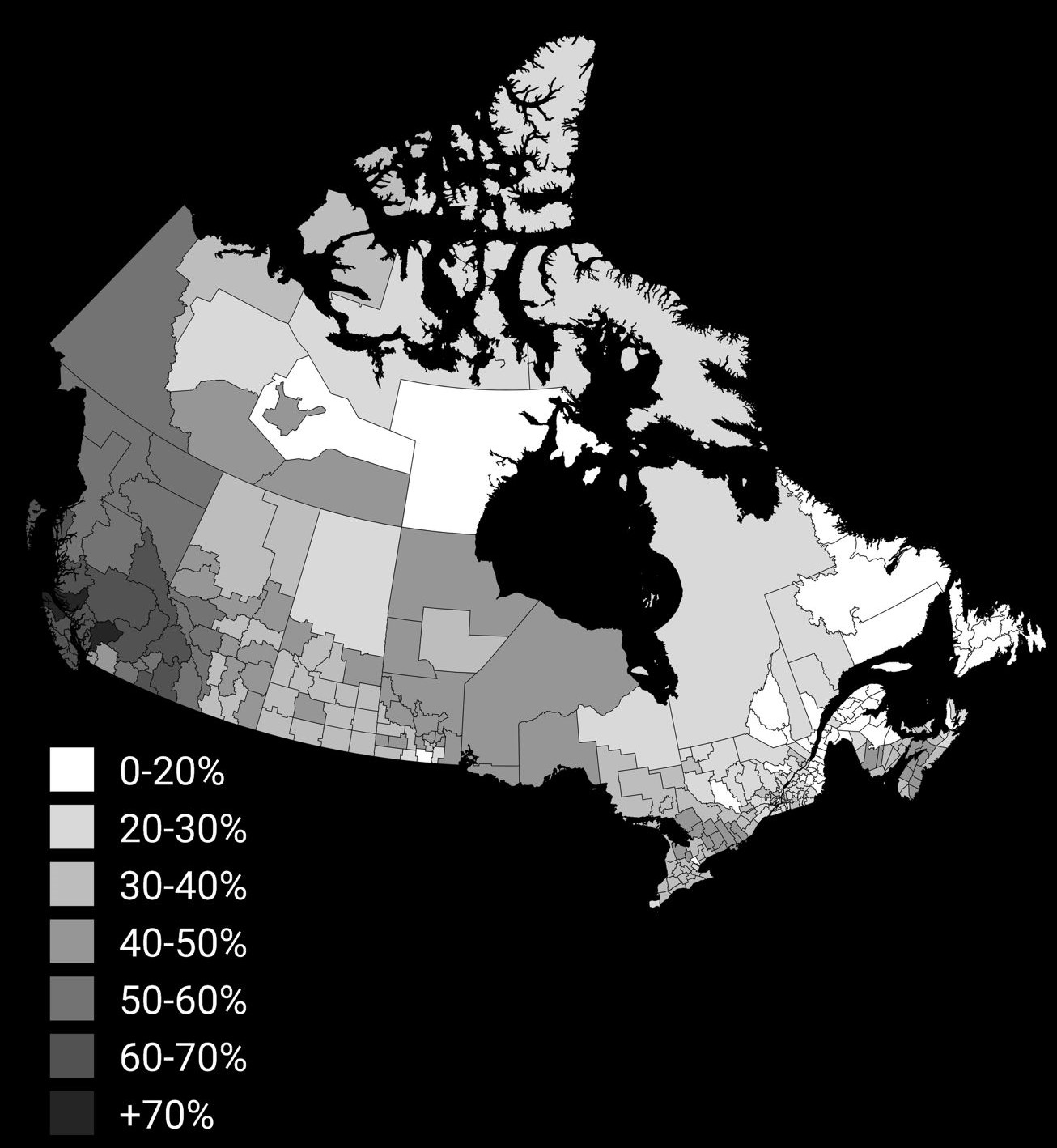
- Population distribution of Irreligious Canadians by census division, 2021 census

Total population
- 12,577,475; 34.6% of the total Canadian population (2021)

Regions with significant populations
- Ontario: 4,433,675 (31.60%)
- British Columbia: 2,559,250 (52.06%)
- Quebec: 2,267,715 (27.29%)
- Alberta: 1,676,045 (40.12%)
- Manitoba: 480,315 (36.74%)

Languages
- Canadian English • Canadian French; Other Languages of Canada

Related ethnic groups
- Irreligious Americans • Irreligious Australians • Irreligious Brits • Irreligious New Zealanders

Percent of Canadians not identifying with a religion by province or territory in 2011 0–9% irreligious 10–19% irreligious 20–29% irreligious 30–39% irreligious ≥ 40% irreligious

Irreligion is common throughout all provinces and territories of Canada. Irreligious Canadians include atheists, agnostics, and secular humanists. The surveys may also include those who are deists, spiritual, and pantheists. The 2021 Canadian census reported that 34.6% of Canadians declare no religious affiliation, which is up from 23.9% in the 2011 Canadian census and 16.5% in the 2001 Canadian census. According to Ontario Consultants on Religious Tolerance, among those estimated 4.9 million Canadians of no religion, an estimated 1.9 million would specify atheist, 1.8 million would specify agnostic, and 1.2 million humanist.

== Surveys and public opinion polls ==
In 2011, a survey conducted by Ipsos-Reid showed that 47% of the Canadian population believed religion does more harm in the world than good, while 64% believed that religion provides more questions than answers. A 2008 Canadian Press Harris-Decima telephone survey of just over 1,000 Canadians found 23% were willing to state they do not believe in any God.

The Canadian Ipsos-Reid poll released September 12, 2011 entitled "Canadians Split On Whether Religion Does More Harm in the World than Good", sampled 1,129 Canadian adults and came up with 30% who do not believe in a God. The same poll found that 33% of respondents who identified themselves as Catholics and 28% Protestants said they didn't believe in a God.

A 2010 80-questions mail-in survey of 420 Canadians by Carleton University Survey Centre and the Montreal-based Association for Canadian Studies found 30% agreed with the statement "I know God really exists and I have no doubts", 20% acknowledged they "have doubts" but "feel that I do believe in God", 10% answered they believe in God "sometimes", 20% said they don't believe in a "personal God" but "do believe in a higher power", 12% adopted the classic agnostic position and said they "don't know whether there is a God and don't believe there is a way to find out", and 7% said no God exists. Slightly more than half believed in heaven, while less than a third believed in hell, with 53.5% saying they believed in life after death. About 27% said they believe in reincarnation, and 50% expressed belief in religious miracles.

== Associations ==
Many non-religious Canadians have formed associations, such as the Humanist Association of Canada which was founded in 1968, the Centre for Inquiry Canada, the University of Toronto-based Toronto Secular Alliance, Canadian Atheists, and the Society of Freethinkers which was founded in 1992. In 1999, hundreds of non-religious Canadians signed a petition to remove the mention of "God" from the preamble to the Canadian Constitution. Past House of Commons members, Svend Robinson, who tabled this petition in Parliament, was subsequently relegated to the backbenches by his party leader. Shortly afterwards, the same group petitioned to remove the mention of "God" from the Canadian national anthem, "O Canada", but have not yet succeeded.

In 2015, the Mouvement Laïque Québécois (Quebec Secular Movement) obtained a ruling by the Supreme Court of Canada that "reciting prayer at start of each meeting of council is in breach of principle of religious neutrality of state and results in discriminatory interference with freedom of conscience and religion" and should therefore be abolished".

== Survey by province ==
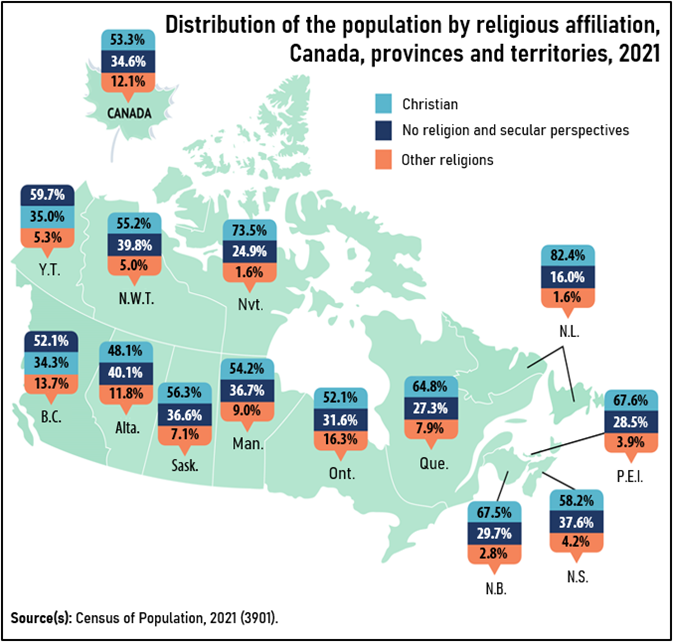
A map of Canada by province and territory showing the distribution of the population by religious affiliation in 2021

The Canadian provinces and territories ranked by percentage of population claiming no religion according to the 2001 Canadian Census, the 2011 Canadian Census and the 2021 Canadian Census These results were obtained with the question "What is this person's religion?"

| Rank | Jurisdiction | % Irreligious (2021) | % Irreligious (2011) | % Irreligious (2001) | Change (2011—2021) | Change (2001–2011) |
|---|---|---|---|---|---|---|
| - | Canada | 34.6% | 23.9% | 16.2% | +10.7 | +7.7 |
| 01 | Yukon | 59.7% | 49.9% | 37.4% | +9.8 | +12.5 |
| 02 | British Columbia | 52.1% | 44.1% | 35.1% | +8 | +9.0 |
| 03 | Alberta | 40.1% | 31.6% | 23.1% | +8.5 | +8.5 |
| 04 | Northwest Territories | 39.8% | 30.5% | 17.4% | +9.3 | +13.1 |
| 05 | Nova Scotia | 37.6% | 21.8% | 11.6% | +15.8 | +10.2 |
| 06 | Manitoba | 36.7% | 26.5% | 18.3% | +10.2 | +8.2 |
| 07 | Saskatchewan | 36.6% | 24.4% | 15.4% | +12.2 | +9.0 |
| 08 | Ontario | 31.6% | 23.1% | 16.0% | +8.5 | +7.1 |
| 09 | New Brunswick | 29.7% | 15.1% | 7.8% | +14.6 | +7.3 |
| 10 | Prince Edward Island | 28.5% | 14.4% | 6.5% | +14.1 | +7.9 |
| 11 | Quebec | 27.3% | 12.1% | 5.6% | +15.2 | +6.5 |
| 12 | Nunavut | 24.9% | 13.0% | 6.0% | +11.9 | +7.0 |
| 13 | Newfoundland and Labrador | 16.0% | 6.2% | 2.5% | +9.8 | +3.7 |

The Canadian provinces ranked by percentage of population claiming to believe in God according to Association for Canadian Studies. These are results obtained of respondents' agreement with the statement "I believe in God", in a poll conducted in May 2019.

| Rank | Jurisdiction | % Strongly or somewhat agree | % Strongly or somewhat disagree | Ratio |
|---|---|---|---|---|
| - | Canada | 58.80% | 28.40% | 2.07 |
| 01 | Nova Scotia | 42.40% | 42.40% | 1.00 |
| 02 | British Columbia | 48.20% | 39.60% | 1.22 |
| 03 | Quebec | 53.50% | 33.50% | 1.60 |
| 04 | Prince Edward Island | 40.00% | 20.00% | 2.00 |
| 05 | Alberta | 63.70% | 25.80% | 2.47 |
| 06 | Ontario | 63.60% | 24.50% | 2.60 |
| 07 | New Brunswick | 60.50% | 18.70% | 3.24 |
| 08 | Manitoba | 65.80% | 20.30% | 3.24 |
| 09 | Newfoundland and Labrador | 65.80% | 15.80% | 4.16 |
| 10 | Saskatchewan | 73.20% | 9.00% | 8.13 |

== Ethnic group ==
% of Irreligious Canadians Ethnic groups (2001−2021)
| | 2021 | | 2011 | | 2001 | |
| | Population | % | Population | | Population | % |
| European | 9,289,060 | 73.85% | 6,020,695 | 76.69% | 3,811,880 | 77.79% |
| Chinese | 1,230,520 | 9.78% | 852,740 | 10.86% | 603,115 | 12.31% |
| Indigenous | 849,560 | 6.75% | 437,570 | 5.57% | 212,120 | 4.33% |
| African | 278,895 | 2.22% | 125,905 | 1.6% | 80,430 | 1.64% |
| South Asian | 156,885 | 1.25% | 67,405 | 0.86% | 30,610 | 0.62% |
| Latin American | 141,470 | 1.12% | 51,035 | 0.65% | 20,775 | 0.42% |
| Southeast Asians | 139,805 | 1.11% | 71,840 | 0.92% | 39,915 | 0.81% |
| Multiracial | 102,885 | 0.82% | 39,715 | 0.51% | 13,875 | 0.28% |
| West Asians | 102,610 | 0.82% | 39,930 | 0.51% | 9,940 | 0.2% |
| Koreans | 86,780 | 0.69% | 44,195 | 0.56% | 20,040 | 0.41% |
| Japanese | 66,930 | 0.53% | 49,150 | 0.63% | 34,660 | 0.71% |
| Filipino | 54,735 | 0.44% | 19,230 | 0.24% | 6,990 | 0.14% |
| Arabs | 40,010 | 0.32% | 15,300 | 0.19% | 5,435 | 0.11% |
| Other Ethnicity | 37,365 | 0.3% | 15,885 | 0.2% | 9,320 | 0.19% |
| Total Irreligious; Canadian Population | 12,577,475 | 100% | 7,850,605 | 100% | 4,900,095 | 100% |

== See also ==
- Humanist Canada
- Importance of religion by country
- Irreligion by country
- Mouvement laïque québécois
- Religion in Canada
- Secular Thought was a Canadian periodical from 1887–1911
