= Irreligion in Latvia =

Religion in Latvia, 2011
1. Lutheranism (34.3%)
2. Catholicism (25.1%)
3. Orthodoxy & Old Believers (19.4%)
4. Other Christians (1.20%)
5. Other or None (20.0%)

Irreligion in Latvia pertains to atheism, agnosticism, and lack of religious affiliation in Latvia. Irreligious thought in Latvian history is associated with national identity and a period of Communist rule. In 2019, the irreligious make up a significant minority group in Latvia today, with 30.2% of Latvians identifying as irreligious.

== History ==
Secularism in Latvia first became notable during the formation of a Latvian national identity in the 18th century, when German influences such as Christianity came in conflict with romantic nationalism influenced by ancient Latvian culture. Irreligious ideas as a whole became more prominent in the 19th and 20th centuries with the spread of irreligious ideologies like freethought and socialism. Religious education was the main issue faced by irreligion in Latvia during the early 20th century, though marriage, divorce, and baptism also saw secular government regulation. Pēteris Stučka, Jānis Sudrabkalns and Andrejs Upīts were notable contributors to irreligious ideas during this period. Following Latvian independence in 1918, separation of church and state was established.

Following the 1934 Latvian coup d'état, religion and irreligion were both restricted, with the church controlled by the dictatorship of Kārlis Ulmanis. After World War II, Latvia was occupied by the Soviet Union and state atheism was established. Latgale retained its Catholic character during this time, so attempts to spread atheist propaganda in this area were expanded in the 1950s. Over the course of Soviet rule, traditions and day-to-day life became increasingly secularized. Secular celebrations, such as kapu svētki and bērnības svētki, were introduced to replace Christian celebrations.

After Latvia regained independence, the Constitution of Latvia established freedom of religion and separation of church and state. However, Christianity and Judaism are given extra legal privileges. Much of Soviet-era secularization has been reversed, and Christianity is still seen as a major component of Latvian culture in the 21st century.

== Demographics ==
In 2018, 32% of Latvians identified as irreligious or undecided, with 15% of Latvians explicitly identifying as atheist. The region of Latgale has fewer irreligious citizens than other parts of the country, with a 2011 survey finding that only 5.8% of the population was irreligious.

Below is a table detailing prevalence of irreligious belief in Latvia since 2000.

| Religious affiliation | 2000 | 2001 | 2003 | 2005 | 2006 | 2007 | 2008 | 2009 | 2010 | 2011 | 2014 | 2016 | 2018 |
|---|---|---|---|---|---|---|---|---|---|---|---|---|---|
| Irreligious theist | 10% | 12.8% | 9% | 11% | 10% | 10% | 10% | 10% | 11% | 9% | 9.7% | 10% | 14% |
| Atheist | 18% | 17.7% | 12% | 16% | 14% | 14% | 11% | 15% | 16% | 14% | 16.4% | 17% | 15% |
| Undecided | 3% | 2% | 3% | 3% | 6% | 4% | 2% | 2% | 0% | 1% | 2% | 2% | 3% |

== See also ==
- Demographics of Latvia
- Religion in Latvia
