= Irreligion in Uganda =

Irreligion in Uganda is uncommon among Ugandans, as Christianity is the predominant faith. Only 0.9% of Ugandans claim no religion. Most Ugandans are considered religious and there is a great stigma attached to being a non-believer.

== See also ==
- Religion in Uganda
- Islam in Uganda
- Demographics of Uganda
