= Jānis Sudrabkalns =

Latvian poet and writer

- Born: Arvīds Peine; May 17, 1894; Inčukalns, Government of Livland (now Latvia)
- Died: September 4, 1975 (aged 81); Rīga, Latvian SSR
- Occupations: Poet, writer, journalist
- Writing career
- Genres: Poetry, prose, documentary

Jānis Sudrabkalns (May 17, 1894 – September 4, 1975), born Arvīds Peine, was a Latvian poet and writer.

== Biography ==
Born in to the family of an innkeeper and teacher, the family moved to Jaunpiebalga when he was a child. After the death of his father, Arvīds interrupted his studies at the gymnasium and gained further knowledge through self-study. He wrote poems from the age of ten, the first poem "Mežā ziemu" under the pseudonym Teodors Pērle was published in 1909. From 1913 he lived with short breaks in Riga.

During the First World War, in 1915, Sudrabkalns was mobilized into the army. In March 1917, he was posted to the newspaper "Brīvais strēlnieks" (later "Latvju strēlnieks"). At the beginning of 1918, Sudrabkalns was demobilized due to his poor health and started working as a proofreader in the newspaper "Līdums", where his first humorous poem "Pavasara zaļais karogs" was published on May 4, 1918 under the pseudonym Olivereto. During this time, the young poet fell in love with the actress Biruta Skujeniece. In 1919 during the Latvian Socialist Soviet Republic, he worked as a translator for the communist newspaper Cīņa.

From 1925, he considered his literary activity to be his main activity, in 1927 he changed his surname and from then on the documents were Arvīds Sudrabkalns, while his works were signed as Jānis Sudrabkalns. Throughout the 1920s and 1930s, Sudrabkalns worked at various newspapers such as Latvijas Vēstnesis, Jaunākās Ziņas and Dienas Lapa, where he published many articles on Latvian, German, English, Russian and Italian literature, theater and music.

In the summer of 1940, after Latvia became part of the Soviet Union, Sudrabkalns enthusiastically sided with the Soviet regime. In June 1941, he was a delegate to the First Congress of the Union of Soviet Writers of Latvia. At the beginning of the Second World War, he was evacuated to Russia. From January 1942 to September 1944 he lived in Moscow.

In the fall of 1944, he returned to Latvia. In the post-war years, he performed a number of public functions. He was a member and then chairman of the Latvian SSR Peace Committee (1951–1962), a member of the board of directors of the Writers' Union (1941–1975) and from 1963 to 1971 he was a member of the Central Committee of the Communist Party of Latvia. In 1973 he was elected an academician of the Latvian Academy of Sciences.

He died on September 4, 1975 in Riga, and was buried at the Rainis Cemetery.

== Works ==
=== Poetry ===
- "Džentlmens ceriņu frakā" (faksimilizdevums). Losandželosa: Hofmanis (1985)
- "Brāļu saimē". R.: Liesma (1984)
- "Vēl viens pavasaris". R.: Latvijas Valsts izdevniecība (1964)
- "Brāļu saimē". R.: Latvijas Valsts izdevniecība (1947)
- "Ceļa maize". Maskava: Latvijas PSR grāmatu apgāds (1944)
- "Cīruļi sauc cīņā". Maskava (1942)
- "Spuldze vējā". R.: Valters un Rapa (1931)
- "Spārnotā Armāda". 2. iespiedums. R.: Valters un Rapa (1926)
- "Džentlmens ceriņu frakā". R.: Latvju kultūra (1924)
- "Pārvērtības". R.: Valters un Rapa (1924)
- "Viņpus laba un ļauna". Rīga (1922)
- "Trubadūrs uz ēzeļa". R.: Vainags (1921)
- "Spārnotā Armāda". R.: A. Gulbis (1920)

=== Prose ===
- Divas noveles [Laivinieks. Ģenerāļa Dombrovska nāve] // Две новеллы [Лодочник. Смерть генерала Домбровского]. Tulk. R. Trofimovs. R.: Liesma (1971)
- Bezdelīgas atgriežas. R.: Latvijas Valsts izdevniecība (1951)
- Viena bezdelīga lido. R.: Valters un Rapa (1937)
- Trīs vilšanās. R.: Letas mazā bibliotēka (1927)

=== Documentary prose ===
- Kā rīta un vakara zvaigzne...: Jāņa Sudrabkalna sarakste ar Birutu Skujenieci. R.: Daugava (2002)
- Vēstules, 1-3. R.: Zinātne (1986 - 1989)

=== Essays ===
- Par mūziku. R.: Zinātne (1983)
- Ar mūzām draugos. R.: Liesma (1974)
- Par teātri. R.: Zinātne (1973)

=== Journalism ===
- Cīņa, darbs un slava. R.: Latvijas Valsts izdevniecība (1963)
- Karogi sasaucas. R.: Latvijas Valsts izdevniecība (1950)
