= Irreligion in the Czech Republic =

Religion in the Czech Republic (National Census 2021)
1. Unaffiliated (47.8%)
2. Catholicism (9.30%)
3. Other Christians (2.40%)
4. Believers without religion (9.60%)
5. Other religions (1.20%)
6. Undeclared (30.1%)

Irreligion in the Czech Republic pertains to atheism, agnosticism, and lack of religious affiliation in the Czech Republic. The history of irreligion in the Czech Republic dates back to 19th century freethought movements, and saw additional developments during Communist rule. A majority of people in the Czech Republic are irreligious or otherwise unaffiliated, and the country is considered to be one of the most irreligious in the world.

== History ==
Irreligion among Czechs first became notable in the 1860s with the arrival of freethought in the region. Czech freethought was influenced in particular by Herbert Spencer and his interpretation of positivism. These ideas of freethought and anti-clericalism were adopted by progressive movements that sought to both resist and improve religious ideas in the new country. As Czechoslovakia sought independence from Austria-Hungary in the early 20th century, anti-clericalism developed as part of the newfound national identity, and freethought was suppressed by imperial authorities. After achieving independence, Czechoslovakia enacted laws that protected the separation of church and state. The book Advisor for Citizens with No Confession was popular among the irreligious, serving as a manual on how to navigate Czech institutions without church affiliation.

As Czechoslovakia found itself in the Soviet sphere of influence in the 1940s, the popularity of positivist freethought among irreligious Czechs fell in favor of Marxist atheism. The country eventually fell under Communist dictatorship, freethought groups were exterminated, and the translation of western philosophy into Czech was replaced by Marxist propaganda. From October 1949, Marxist-Leninist atheism and anti-Church policies became the only correct and acceptable positions, and Státní úřad pro věci církevní (The State Office for Church Affairs) was established to supervise the Churches. Religion was gradually framed as anachronistic, false, and fictional. Despite this, the 1950 census showed that 77% of the country’s population still identified as believers, and only 5.8% stated that they were non-religious, whilst 22,889 respondents—i.e. approximately 0.3%—did not specify. Furthermore, even in the 1950s, the overwhelming majority of Communist Party of Czechoslovakia (KSČ) members remained active believers (specifically, in 1953, as many as 63.9% of KSČ members stated that they were Roman Catholic).

However, initially state atheism was not enforced as it was in some other Communist countries. Czech writers such as Ivan Sviták, Milan Machovec, and Vítězslav Gardavský played a major role in developing and spreading atheism in the country, alternatively promoting and criticizing the dogmatic atheism of Marxism. This period of independent thought ended with the invasion of Czechoslovakia by the Soviet Union in 1968, after which state atheism was strictly enforced. During the final years of Communist rule in Czechoslovakia, popular opinion was indifferent to religious disagreements, favoring neither religious belief nor Marxist atheism.

Following the Velvet Revolution and the Dissolution of Czechoslovakia, there was a brief increase in religious affiliation in the Czech Republic. Overwhelming opposition to Communist rule in the country led to the adoption of church affiliation as a political statement, and the 1991 census demonstrated a significant jump in religiosity compared to its status under Communist rule in the 1970s and 1980s. Over time, however, irreligion was shown to have maintained its prevalence in the Czech Republic. Today, the Czech Republic is widely recognized as one of the most irreligious countries in the world.

== Demographics ==
Age composition of irreligion in Czechia, 2011

In the 2021 census, 57.4% of Czechs identified as not having a religion or as an irreligious believer. In 1998, only 43.0% of Czechs believed in an afterlife, and this number shrank to 36.1% in 2006, while other supernatural beliefs still remain prevalent. As many as 69.7% of Czechs believed in fortune tellers in 1998, although the number dropped to 53.0% by 2006.

Below is a table with statistics of irreligious and unaffiliated Czechs in each census from 1921 to 2021.

Religion	1921		1930		1950		1991		2001		2011		2021	
Religion	Number	%	Number	%	Number	%	Number	%	Number	%	Number	%	Number	%
Believers without religion	–	–	–	–	–	–	–	–	–	–	760,316	7.3	1,005,788	9.6
No religion	716,515	7.2	834,144	7.8	519,962	5.8	4,112,864	39.9	6,039,991	59.0	3,604,095	34.5	5,027,794	47.8
Not stated	10,871	0.1	31,033	0.3	22,889	0.3	1,665,617	16.2	901,981	8.8	4,662,455	44.7	3,162,540	30.1

== See also ==
- Demographics of the Czech Republic
- Religion in the Czech Republic
