= Irreligion in Saudi Arabia =

Irreligion in Saudi Arabia is difficult to measure as it is illegal to leave the Islamic faith in the country. Most atheists in Saudi Arabia communicate with each other via the Internet.

According to a 2012 poll by WIN-Gallup International, 5% of 502 Saudi Arabians surveyed stated they were "convinced atheists".

In March 2014, the Saudi interior ministry had issued a royal decree branding all atheists as terrorists, which defines terrorism as "calling for atheist thought in any form, or calling into question the fundamentals of the Islamic religion on which this country is based."

Apostasy is punishable by death in Saudi Arabia.

== Notable irreligious Saudis ==
- Abdullah al-Qasemi (1907 - 1996) – Saudi Arabian 20th-century writer and intellectual. Former Salafist who became atheist and rejected organized religion.

== See also ==
- Religion in Saudi Arabia
- Freedom of religion in Saudi Arabia
