= Alliance =

Coalition of individuals to secure common interests

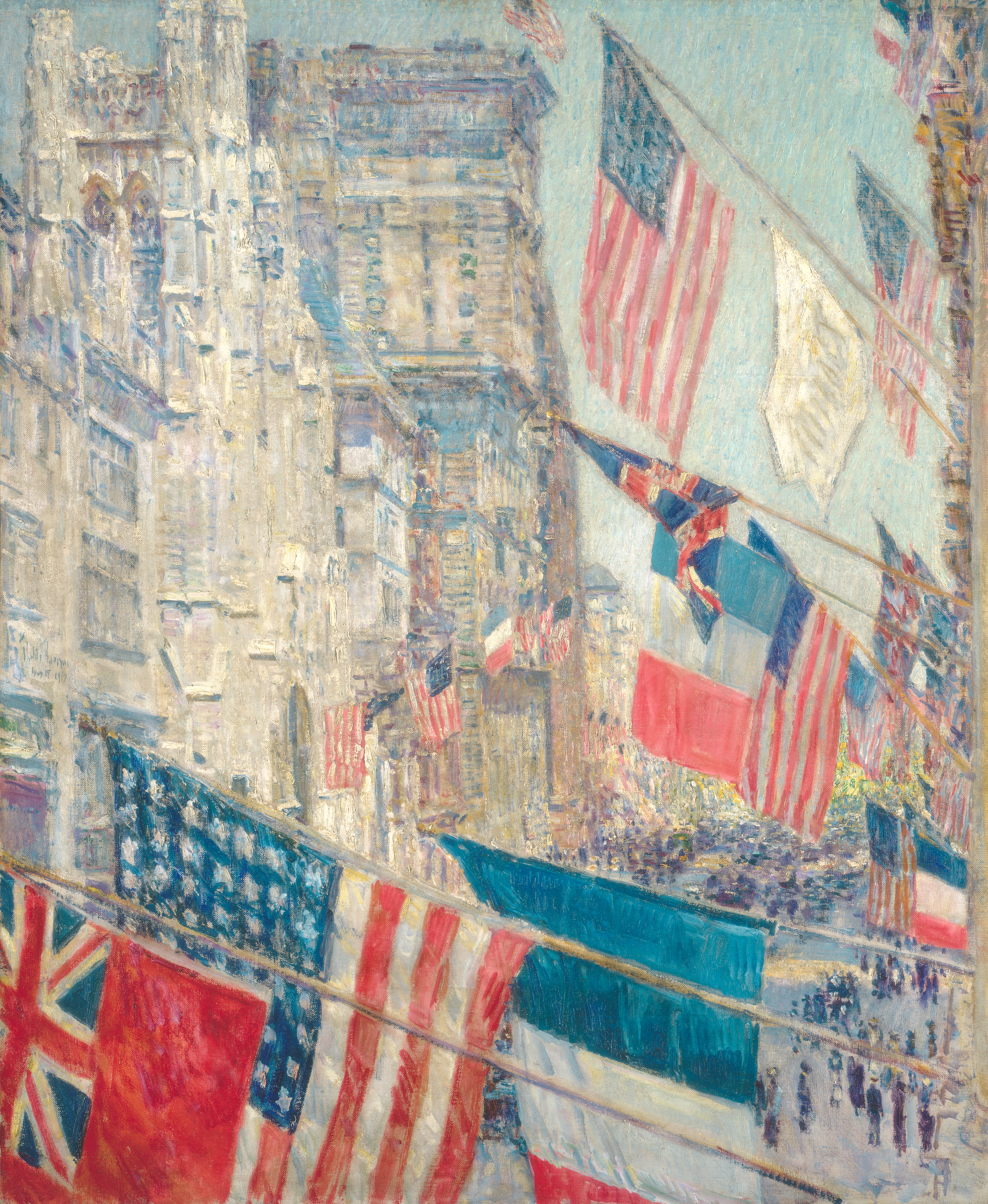
Allies Day, May 1917, National Gallery of Art

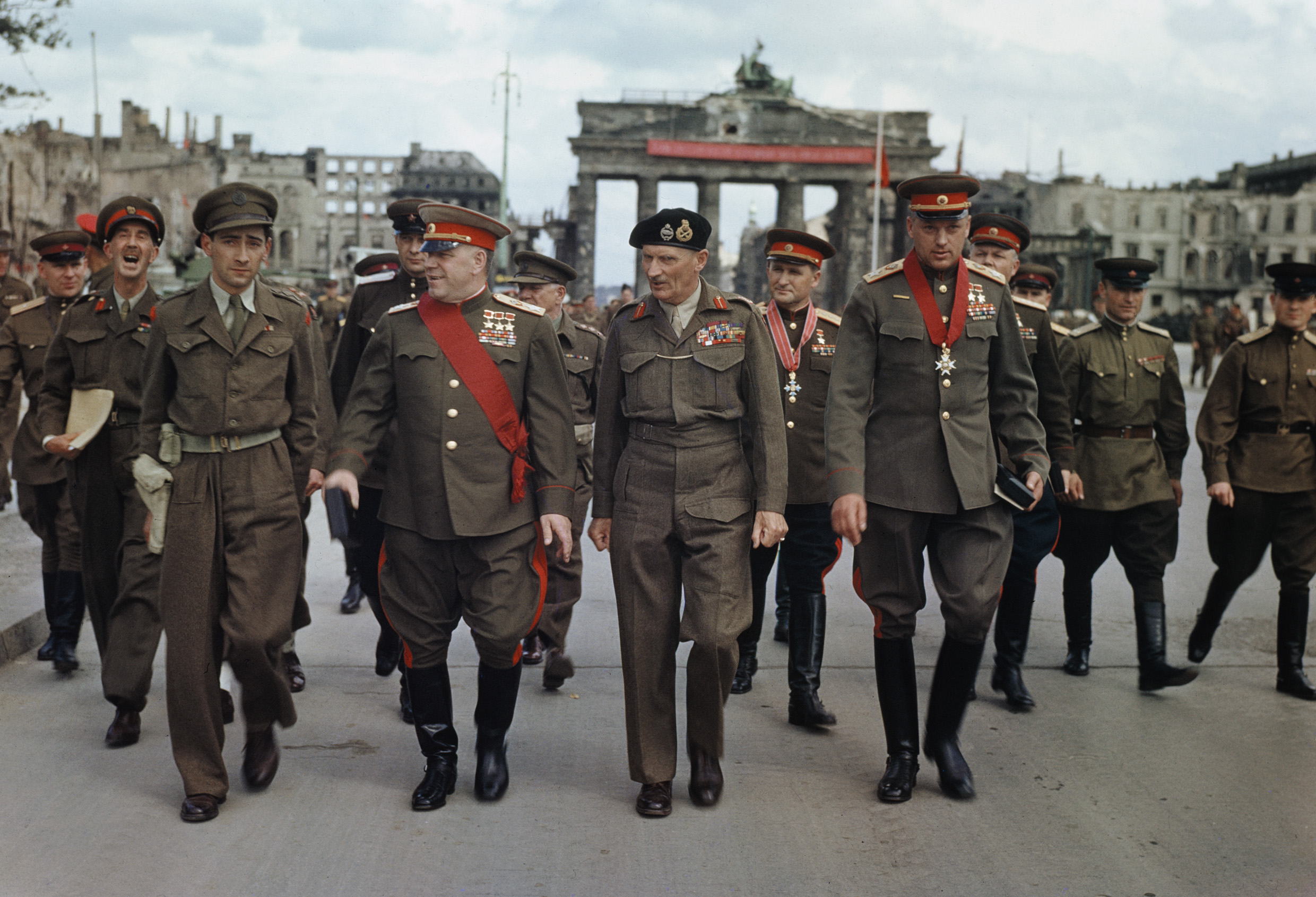
Field Marshal Bernard Montgomery decorates Soviet Marshals and generals at the Brandenburg Gate in Berlin, 12 July 1945.

An alliance is a relationship among people, groups, or states that have joined together for mutual benefit or to achieve some common purpose, whether an explicit agreement has been worked out among them. Members of an alliance are called allies. Alliances form in many settings, including political alliances, military alliances, and business alliances.

== Examples ==
When spelled with a capital "A", "the Allies" usually denotes the countries who fought together against the Central Powers in World War I (the Allies of World War I), or those who fought against the Axis Powers in World War II (the Allies of World War II).

In the second half of the 20th century, the Cold War was characterised by the intense rivalry between the military alliances of NATO and the Warsaw Pact, as each competed to expand and maintain their spheres of influence.

More recently, the term "Allied forces" has also been used to describe the coalition of the Gulf War, as opposed to forces the Multi-National Forces in Iraq which are commonly referred to as "Coalition forces" or, as by the George W. Bush administration, "the coalition of the willing".

At the onset of the 21st century, shifts in the global order led to the formation of new alliances rooted in ideological and historical precedents, exemplified by Brazil, Russia, India, China, and South Africa (BRICS). This alliance possesses a broad and vaguely defined agenda, with its members exhibiting varying degrees of commitment to and motivations for participating in this initiative. The inaugural BRICS meeting occurred in 2006. In 2023, the alliance expanded with the invitation of six new members—Argentina, Egypt, Ethiopia, Iran, Saudi Arabia, and the United Arab Emirates—and was rebranded as BRICS Plus.

== Effects ==
Scholars are divided as to the impact of alliances. Several studies find that defensive alliances deter conflict. One study questions these findings, showing that alliance commitments deterred conflict in the prenuclear era but has no statistically meaningful impact on war in the postnuclear era. Another study finds that while alliance commitments deter conflict between sides with a recent history of conflict, alliances tend to provoke conflicts between states without such a history.

A 2000 study in the Journal of Conflict Resolution found that allies fulfill their alliance commitments approximately 75% of the time. Most research suggests that democracies are more reliable allies than non-democracies. A 2004 study did however question whether alliance commitments by democracies are more durable. A 2018 study updated and extended the data from the 2000 Journal of Conflict Resolution study and found that allies only fulfill their commitments about 50% of the time from 1816 to 2003. According to the study, "States honored their alliance commitments 66% of the time prior to 1945 but the compliance rate drops to 22% from 1945 to 2003. Moreover, the rates of fulfillment for defense pacts (41%) and nonaggression pacts (37%) are dramatically lower than offensive alliances (74%) and neutrality agreements (78%)."

One of the most profound effects of alliances can be seen in technological innovation, due to conduits of knowledge flows that are open between allies but closed between rivals.

== International opinion ==
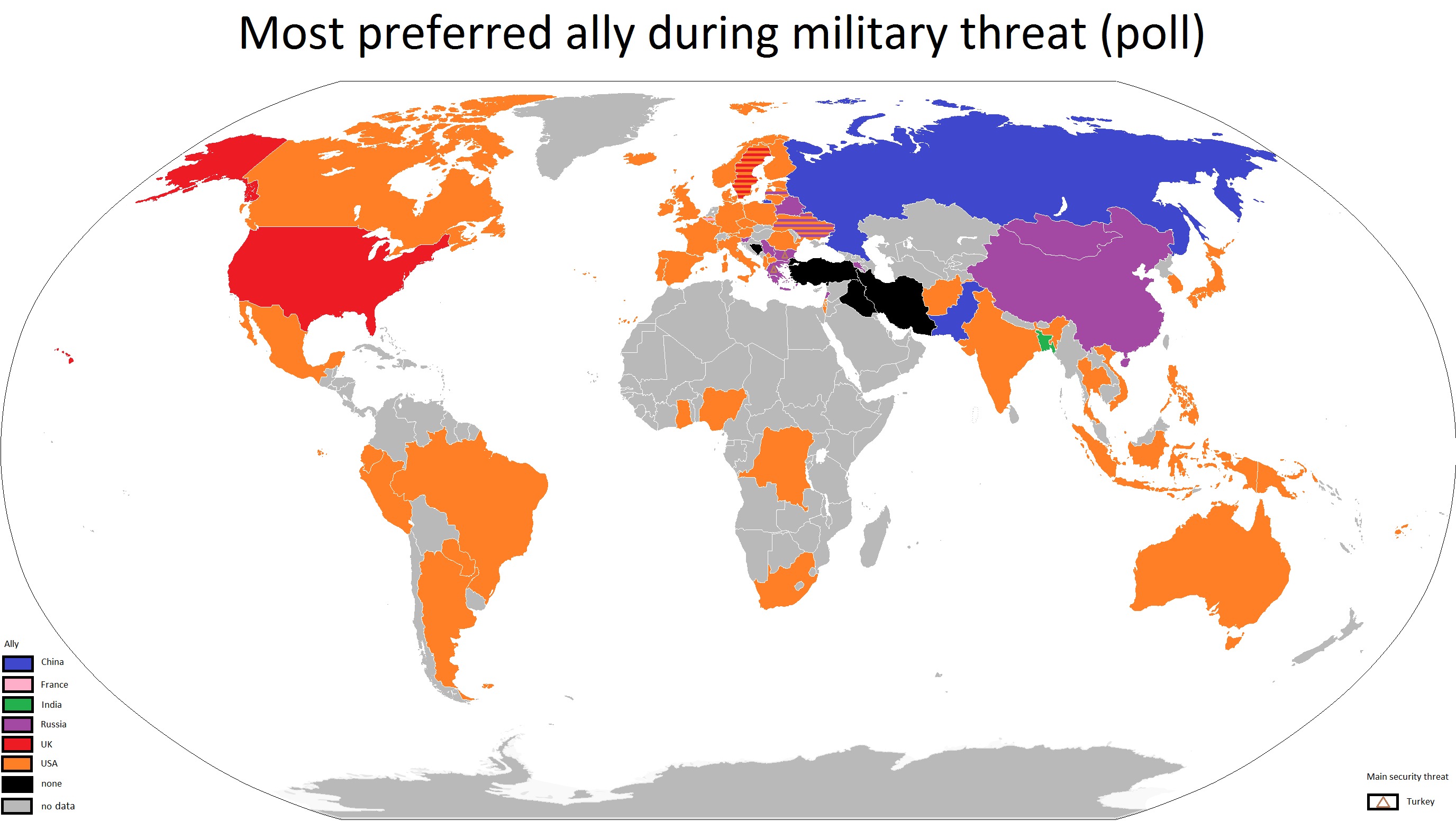
Map indicating international preferences for principal ally in the case a country were attacked, as of 2017.

According to a 2017 poll by WIN/GIA, the United States was the most preferred ally internationally. Russia and China, who preferred one another, both trailed America globally. Four countries, Bulgaria, Greece, Slovenia and Turkey, preferred Russia, despite being members of NATO.

In Pakistan, 72% of respondents preferred ties to China, the largest margin of any country surveyed, while 46% of Bangladesh preferred India. A total of 22 countries indicated a preference for the United Kingdom at a rate of 10% or more, but the United States was the only country to prefer Britain over any other, at a rate of 43%. Five countries preferred France at a rate of 10% or more, led by Belgium at a rate of 25%. A single country, Iraq, expressed no preference, while three other countries, Lebanon, Palestine, and Slovenia, expressed no preference at a rate of 11% or more, although at a smaller rate than their preference for Russia on the part of Lebanon and Slovenia, and China on the part of Palestine. Kosovo reported the most unified opinion, preferring the United States at a rate of 92%, while Russia's most unified supporters were Mongolia (71%), Armenia (67%) and Serbia (56%). In total, 21 countries expressed a preference for America at a rate of 50% or more.

Results of 2017 poll by WIN/GIA. Most preferred ally in case of military threat figures of United States lower than 30%, Russia (<14%), of United Kingdom (<10%), France (<6%), none (<12%) and China (<10%) may be hidden
Country polled	Russia	United States	United Kingdom	China	India	France	none
Mongolia	71%						
Armenia	67%						
Serbia	56%			16%			
Greece	48%						
China	47%						
Bulgaria	42%	17%				4%	
Ukraine	33%	35%	11%				
Slovenia	30%					8%	15%
Latvia		27%	11%				14%
Lebanon	25%					15%	23%
Turkey	23%				9%		31%
North Macedonia	23%	33%					17%
Mexico	22%	42%		11%		9%	
Peru	21%	44%		14%			
Iran	20%						30%
Bosnia and Herzegovina	19%		12%				43%
Vietnam	18%						
India	16%	50%					
Finland	15%	37%	16%				
Romania	15%	51%				7%	
South Africa	15%	45%	21%				
Albania	14%	66%		10%			
Kosovo		92%					
South Korea		49%			10%	32%	
Papua New Guinea		70%		13%			
Israel		68%			10%		
Philippines		67%		16%			
Japan		64%					
Canada		62%	12%				
Ghana		62%		10%			
United Kingdom		58%				8%	
Ecuador		58%					
Lithuania		58%	10%				
Paraguay		57%					
Brazil		55%		10%			
France		54%	13%				
Spain		52%				12%	
Denmark		52%	23%				
Fiji		52%	15%		12%		
Norway		51%	23%				
Australia		49%	16%				
Poland		49%	10%				
Germany		41%				19%	
Italy		41%		11%			
Nigeria		41%					
Portugal		40%	21%				
Afghanistan		39%		22%	17%		
Iceland		38%	27%				
Thailand		38%	11%	29%			
Argentina		36%		13%			22%
Ireland		34%	25%				
Indonesia		32%		10%			21%
Czech Republic		32%	15%			6%	
Sweden		31%	29%			6%	
Estonia		31%	16%				
Belgium		30%	12%			25%	
Austria						16%	
DR Congo				16%		8%	
Palestine				17%		8%	12%
United States			43%			7%	
Iraq						6%	27%
Pakistan				72%			
Bangladesh				16%	46%		
Russia				44%	4%		

== See also ==
- Allies of World War I
- Allies of World War II
- Airline alliance
- Bandwagoning
- Business alliance
- Military alliance
- Neutral country
- Political alliance
- Therapeutic alliance, the relationship between a healthcare professional and a client (or patient)

== Bibliography ==
- Beer, Francis A., ed. (1970). Alliances: Latent War Communities in the Contemporary World. New York: Holt, Rinehart and Winston. ISBN 0030767601. LCCN 70111796. OCLC 1240475795.
