= Irreligion in Hungary =

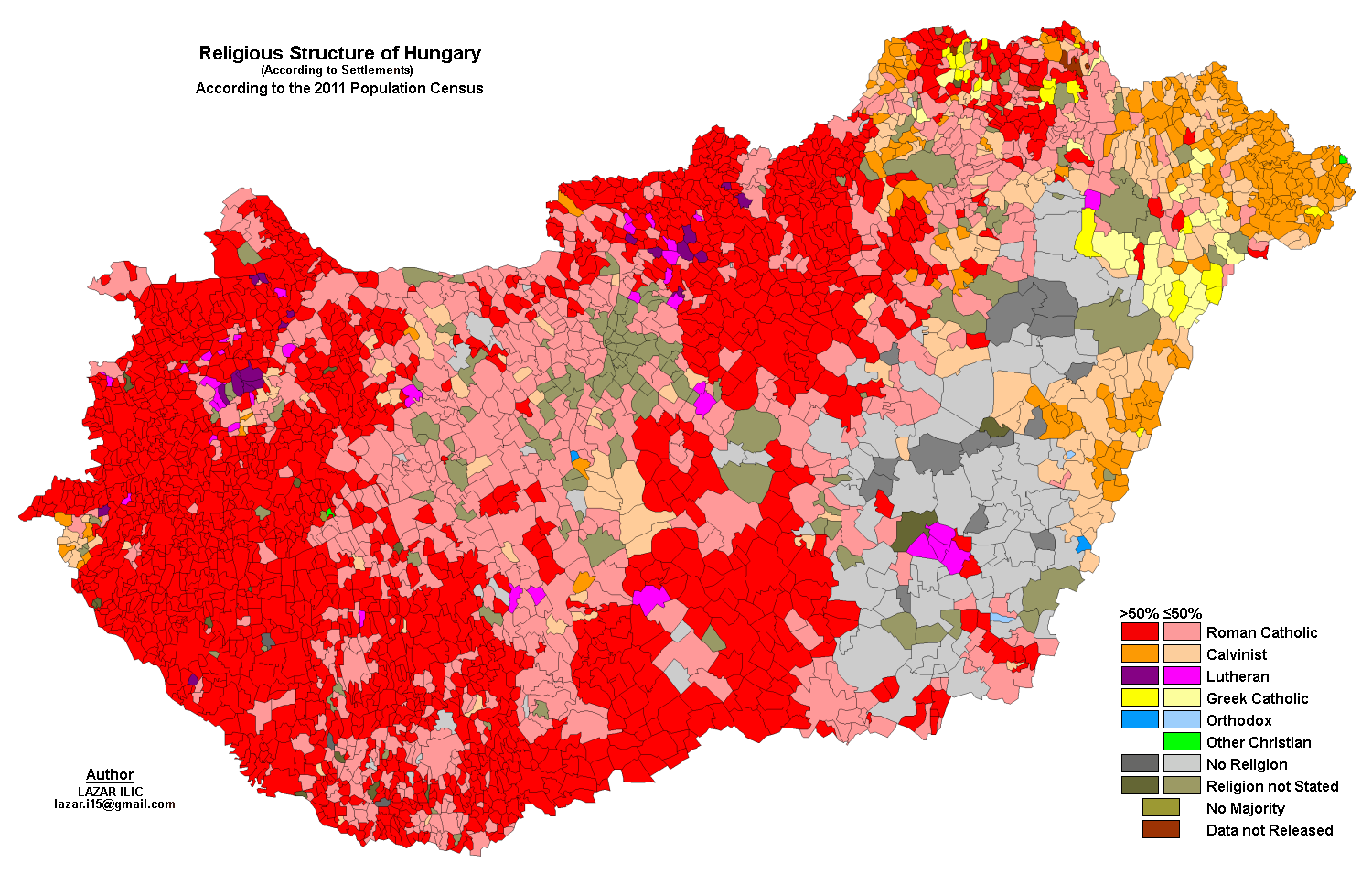
Religion in Hungary, 2011. Irreligious areas are denoted in grey.

Religion in Hungary (Eurobarometer September 2019)
1. Catholicism (62.0%)
2. No religion (20.0%)
3. Protestantism (5.00%)
4. Other Christians (8.00%)
5. Judaism (1.00%)
6. Other (2.00%)
7. Undeclared (2.00%)

Irreligion in Hungary pertains to atheism, agnosticism, and secularism in Hungary. The tradition of irreligion in Hungary originates from the time of Austria-Hungary and it was a significant part of Communist rule in the second half of the 20th century. As of 2011, irreligion is the country's second largest religious stance after Catholicism. In the 2022 census, 42.5% selected Christian, 40.1% did not state their beliefs, and 16.1% had no religion.

== History ==
Secularization in Hungary began in the late eighteenth century as part of Austria-Hungary. Freedom of religion was guaranteed in 1895, and 10% of primary school students attended nonreligious schools by World War I. Freethought gained a notable following among Hungarian intellectuals during this time, with various schools formed around on the ideas of Charles Darwin, Ernst Haeckel, Karl Marx, and Herbert Spencer, as well as influence from anti-clericalism and Continental Freemasonry.

Following World War I, the Hungarian Communist Party briefly took power in 1919 and established a dictatorship, but the regime fell before it could accomplish its goal of state atheism. As a result of the Communist rule, secularism was widely discredited in Hungary, resulting in decades of Christian nationalism. Following World War II, Hungary found itself in the Soviet Union's sphere of influence. Communists took power in Hungary once again, and with Soviet backing, they were able to implement state atheist policies. Religious education was restricted, church land was nationalized, and church participation in public affairs was limited.

The Hungarian Revolution of 1956 marked a turning point in Hungarian state atheism. Following the unrest, the Hungarian government sought to reinforce its position by improving religious conditions, and Hungary became the first country in the Eastern Bloc to restore ties with the Catholic Church. At the same time, religious practice was becoming less popular. Only 46% of the population identified as religious, and only 10% of Catholic Hungarians went to church on Sunday or prepared their children for first communion.

Beginning in the 1960s, religious practice in Hungary saw a period of reduction. While religion had previously been a significant aspect of anti-Communism in Hungary, liberal anti-Communists opposed both Communist rule and clerical rule. After the end of Communist rule in Hungary, state atheism ended and freedom of religion was established as a constitutional right. The courts affirmed that irreligion would be also be protected as part of Hungarian accommodationism and that the state was obligated to protect the right to refuse religion.

In the 21st century, critics have accused the Orbán government of attacking irreligion as part of a pattern of Christian nationalism and democratic backsliding.

== Demographics ==
The 2011 census found that 23% of Hungarians are religiously unaffiliated, while 2% of Hungarians are atheist. In 2019, Eurobarometer found that 20% of Hungarians are not affiliated with any religion.

Irreligion and atheism by county in the 2011 census can be found in the table below.

County	Non-religious	Atheist
Baranya	21.9%	2.0%
Bács-Kiskun	15.8%	1.1%
Békés	41.5%	1.5%
Borsod-Abaúj-Zemplén	15.9%	1.1%
Budapest	30.0%	4.7%
Csongrád	29.8%	2.2%
Fejér	27.6%	2.1%
Győr-Moson-Sopron	12.5%	1.4%
Hajdú-Bihar	35.8%	1.6%
Heves	18.8%	1.4%
Jász-Nagykun-Szolnok	37.9%	1.6%
Komárom-Esztergom	28.3%	2.0%
Nógrád	16.0%	1.1%
Pest	23.3%	2.3%
Somogy	14.9%	1.3%
Szabolcs-Szatmár-Bereg	9.9%	0.6%
Tolna	20.5%	1.3%
Vas	7.1%	1.0%
Veszprém	16.5%	1.5%
Zala	10.7%	1.1%
Hungary	22.9%	2.0%

== See also ==
- Demographics of Hungary
- Religion in Hungary
