= Latvijas Vēstnesis =

Government gazette of Latvia

- Type: Government gazette
- Owner: Government of Latvia
- Publisher: VSIA Latvijas Vēstnesis
- Founded: 14 December 1918 (revived 2 February 1993)
- Language: Latvian
- Headquarters: Raiņa bulvāris 15, Riga
- Website: lv.lv

Latvijas Vēstnesis is the official publisher of the Republic of Latvia, which publishes official government announcements of new legislation and other legal acts, founded in 1993. The name in English means Latvian Messenger or Latvian Herald.

It is considered to be the successor to Pagaidu Valdības Vēstnesis (Messenger of the Provisional Government), the official publication of the Latvian government first issued on 14 December 1918. In 1919 the paper dropped "Provisional" from its name and was published as Valdības Vēstnesis until 1940, when it was dissolved by Soviet occupational authorities.

According to the Law On Official Publications and Legal Information it ensures the following functions:

- implements the state policy in the field of official publication and systematisation of the information included therein;
- promotes the understanding regarding the rights and duties of private individuals specified in regulatory enactments;
- ensures the provision of State official information, the process of official publication and systematisation of the information included therein.

== State company ==
VSIA "Latvijas Vēstnesis" (State LLC) was established on February 2, 1993, as a public enterprise. It is supervised by the Ministry of Justice of the Republic of Latvia. Its processes are carried out according to the requirements of international standards ISO 9001:2015 (quality management system) and ISO 27001:2013 (information security).

Free-to-use services (Vēstnesis.lv, Latvian legislation database Likumi.lv, legislation news portal LV portāls, weekly law journal Jurista Vārds) are provided based on income from publication of official notices and sales of company products.
