= Irreligion in France =

Religion in France (September 2019)
1. Roman Catholic (41.0%)
2. Unaffiliated (40.0%)
3. Orthodox (2.00%)
4. Other Christians (2.00%)
5. Protestant (2.00%)
6. Muslim (5.00%)
7. Buddhist (1.00%)
8. Jewish (1.00%)
9. Other (5.00%)
10. Undeclared (1.00%)

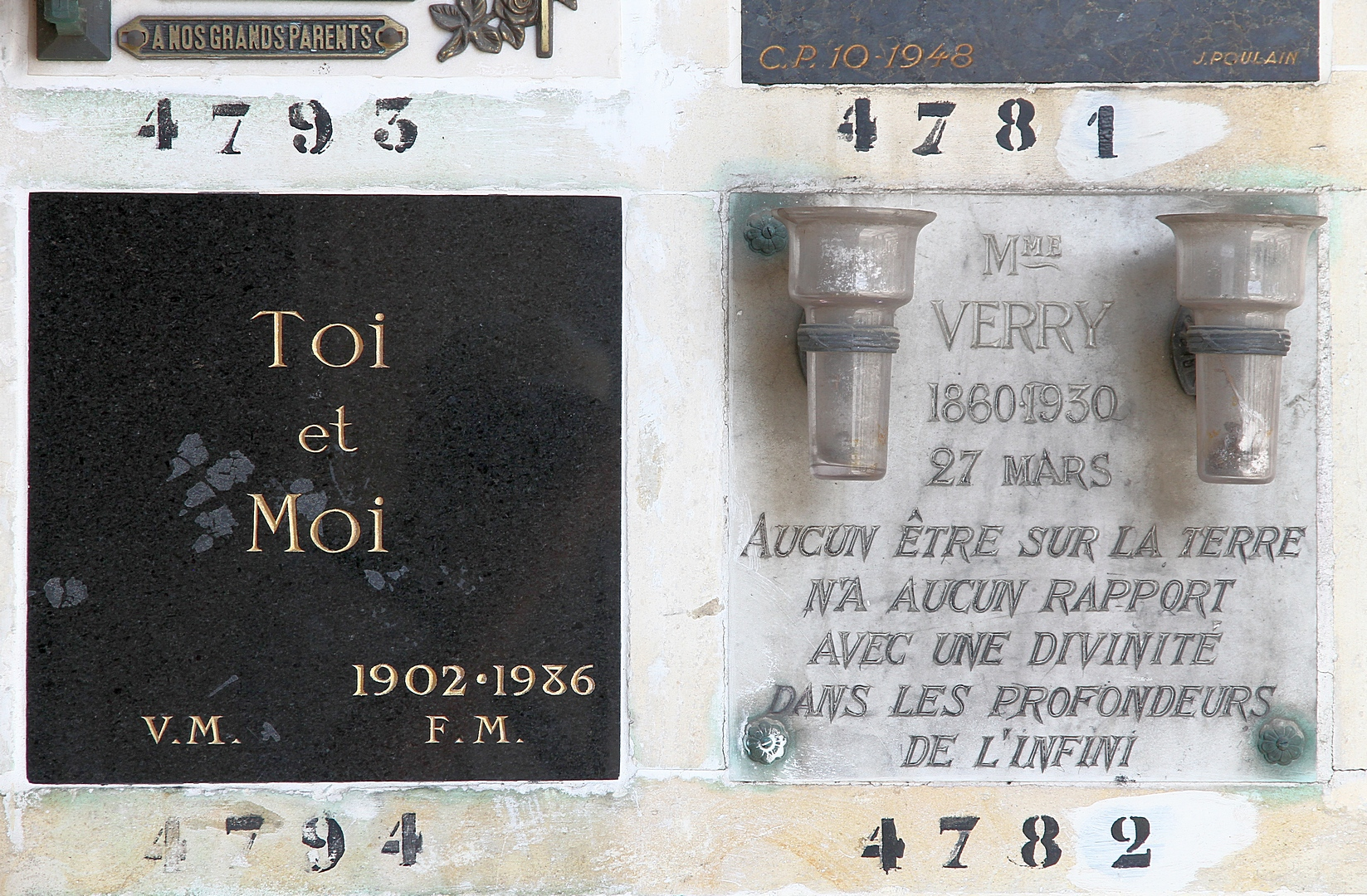
Columbarium of Pere-Lachaise Cemetery, on right: "No being on Earth has any relation to a deity in the depths of infinity".

Irreligion in France has a long history and a large demographic constitution, with the advancement of atheism and the deprecation of theistic religion dating back as far as the French Revolution. In 2015, according to estimates, at least 29% of the country's population identified as convinced atheists. Pew Research Centre's 2018 data had 37% of France saying they do not believe in God. Religious affiliation in 2021 from a report by the Government of France, had those with no religion at 33%.

== History ==
=== Renaissance and Reformation ===
The word atheism was derived from the French athéisme in about 1587.

The term atheist (from Fr. athée), in the sense of "one who denies or disbelieves the existence of God", predates atheism in English, being first attested in about 1571.

=== Persecutions ===
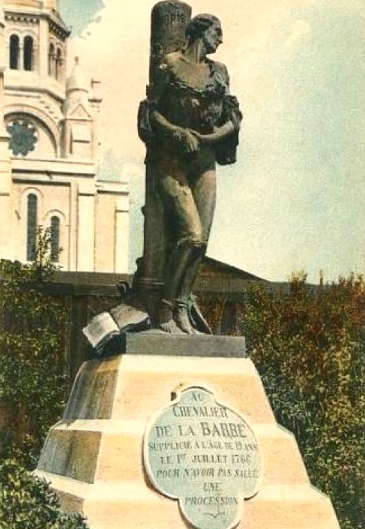
Monument to the Chevalier de La Barre, Paris, 18th arrondissement at Sacré-Cœur de Montmartre, circa 1906

Prior to the Enlightenment, those who embraced a non-theistic belief were regarded as being immoral or amoral, and profession of atheism was considered to be a punishable crime.

Scholar Étienne Dolet was strangled and burnt in 1546 on a charge of atheism; in 1766, the French nobleman François-Jean de la Barre, was tortured, beheaded, and his body burned for alleged vandalism of a crucifix, a case that became celebrated because Voltaire tried unsuccessfully to have the sentence reversed.

Among those accused of atheism was Denis Diderot (1713–1784), one of the Enlightenment's most prominent philosophes, and editor-in-chief of the Encyclopédie, which sought to challenge religious, particularly Catholic, dogma: "Reason is to the estimation of the philosophe what grace is to the Christian", he wrote. "Grace determines the Christian's action; reason the philosophe's". Diderot was briefly imprisoned for his writing, some of which was banned and burned.

=== Enlightenment-era atheism ===
==== French Revolution ====
The French Revolution marked a turning point for the ascendancy of atheism to a preeminent position as a cognitive and cultural stance against papal supremacy and the Holy Roman Empire across Europe and throughout the world. Now known as the atheist Cult of Reason ideology, established by Jacques Hébert, Pierre Gaspard Chaumette and their supporters and intended as a replacement for Christianity, and was replete with ceremonious destruction of Christian relics, conversion of churches into Temples of Reason and the personification of Reason as a goddess; it also held such festivities as the Festival of Reason (or Festival of Liberty), dated on 10 November (20 Brumaire) 1793. The Cult of Reason, which strongly advocated the destruction of Christian and theistic cultural influences by force, was opposed to Robespierre's Cult of the Supreme Being, which was considered a deistic cult which referred back to the theism of Christianity. The Cult of Reason was finally ended by Robespierre and the Committee of Public Safety through their execution of Hébert and several of his followers on 24 March 1794, having ascended just seven months earlier.

=== 19th century ===
Even after the Thermidorean Reaction ended the revolutionary anti-clerical manifestations, the movement for secularization continued during the Napoleonic era and onward. French atheists participated in the increasingly popular political movements which sought for greater economic and political parity in society, the most notable being the French Revolution of 1848 and the Paris Commune of 1871.

In 1877, the Grand Orient de France (GOdF), the largest Masonic body, at the instigation of the Protestant priest Frédéric Desmons, allowed those who had no belief in a Supreme being to be admitted as members, resulting in an ongoing schism between the GOdF and the United Grand Lodge of England (and their respective affiliated lodges) due to the departure of the GOdF from the theistic requirement of belief in a Supreme Being for all members.

=== 20th century ===
In 1905, the law on the Separation of the State and the Church was passed, establishing state secularism in the country and preventing interaction between religious communities and the government, except through religious organizations.

Following the wars, atheists and secular humanists became increasingly involved in defining and interpreting the existence of humanity and the individual, among them being existentialist writer and philosopher Jean-Paul Sartre.

=== 21st century ===
The 21st century, beginning with the advent of the American-led war on terror, has enlivened the debate over the issue of religious liberty, expression and atheistic rationalism in France.

To this day, the GOdF (Grand Orient de France) Masonic organization maintains a strongly secular stance in the public eye and has been frequently accused of a strong anti-Christian position by Roman Catholic apologists and clergy.

Former president François Hollande is an atheist with a Catholic upbringing. President Emmanuel Macron is agnostic, although he converted to Catholicism as a teenager. Former mayor of Paris Anne Hidalgo is an open and outspoken atheist.

== See also ==
- Union des athées
