= Viktor Lennstrand =

Swedish activist (1861–1895)

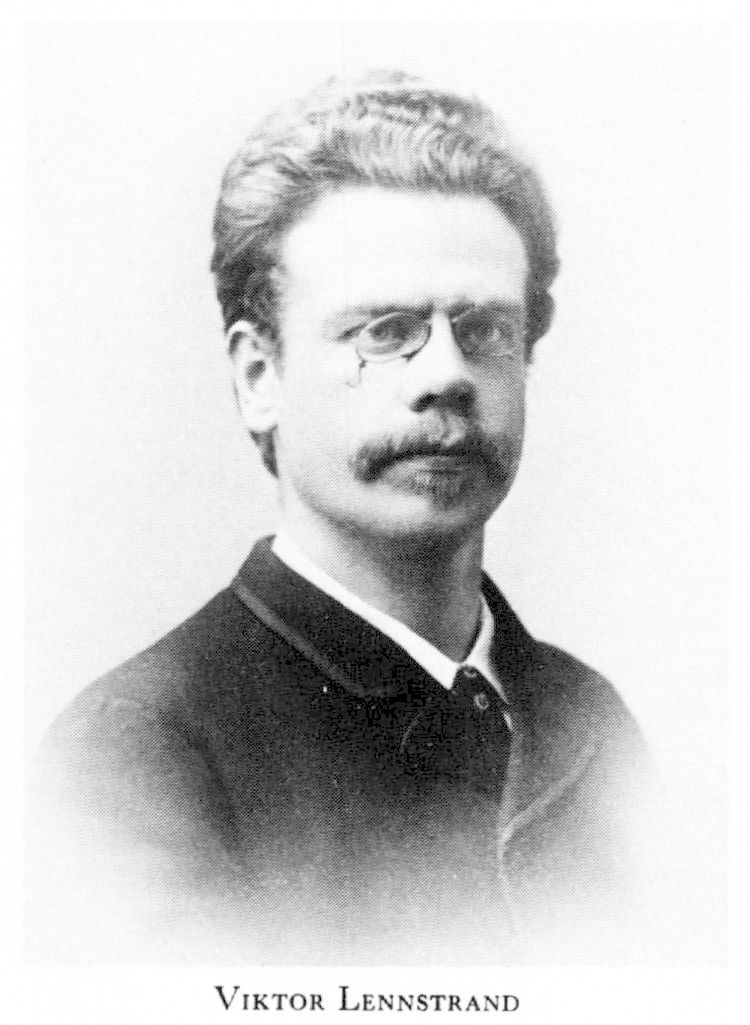
Viktor Lennstrand.

Viktor Emanuel Lennstrand (30 January 1861 - 31 October 1895) was a Swedish Freethought activist and writer.

A former evangelical Christian, Lennstrand gave up his religious doctrines while studying 19th-century philosophy at the University of Uppsala in the 1880s, from which he resigned as an outspoken atheist in 1887. He became committed to the cause of secularism and spent most of the last ten years of his life writing pamphlets, lecturing against Christianity, and campaigning for the abolition of the state church.

A friend of Swedish Social Democratic Party leader Hjalmar Branting and a supporter of the Swedish workers' movement, Lennstrand actively supported universal suffrage and participated in Swedish political life as a Social Democrat in the 1890s.

== Biography ==
Viktor Emanuel Lennstrand was born to master coppersmith Johan Lennstrand and his wife Ewa in Gävle, Sweden, in 1861. Both parents both held devout Protestant convictions, and Viktor received an upbringing steeped in Christianity. Ewa's ambition was that her son would become a missionary. Aside from his mother, one influence on young Viktor Lennstrand was his tutor Paul Petter Waldenström, a theologian and influential figure of the Swedish free church movement in the 1800s. Deeply religious by young adulthood, Lennstrand went off to the University of Uppsala to pursue further studies in 1881.

Lennstrand's horizons were broadly expanded by his university experience. He was afforded the opportunity to study the works of Ludwig Feuerbach, Ernst Haeckel, Charles Darwin, Herbert Spencer, and John Stuart Mill. The philosophical pursuit soon brought Lennstrand to analytically peer at his own conviction in religious faith, and he came out as an open atheist in 1886.

Lennstrand's first lecture on the subject of religion as an atheist came in 1887, when he proceeded to argue on the negative side of the question "Is Christianity a religion for our time?" at the great hall of the university. He was prevented from finishing the lecture by the police. When the university administrators threatened him with expulsion, Lennstrand resigned and left Uppsala for Stockholm, where he took advantage of the opportunity to promote his atheistic and secularist views as a Freethought lecturer in 1887-1888.

Strongly attracted to the utilitarian philosophy of John Stuart Mill, Lennstrand organized the Stockholm-based Utilitiska Stamfund (Utilitarian Society) in 1888. He founded the Fritänkaren (Freethinker) in 1889.

Such activism was regarded with great social hostility and met with a series of attacks from the establishment, who moved to disrupt his work by issuing fines and resorted to prison terms. The Swedish historian Ulf Ilvar Nilsson observes that from September 1887 to September 1893 Lennstrand was charged seven times for religious offenses and was in total sentenced to fourteen months of imprisonment. Lennstrand's contemporary J. M. Robertson records that Lennstrand was sentenced to three months of prison time in November 1888, to three months for blasphemy in October 1889, and to an additional six months at a sentencing in December 1889, with "a prospect of an additional year or two for more blasphemy." The taking care of Lennstrand's duties on the Fritänkaren fell to an associate, Captain Otto Thomson, during the months of Lennstrand's imprisonment. When Lennstrand's health badly deteriorated, thousands of Swedish Freethought supporters registered their protests. Lennstrand was subsequently released from prison in 1890.

Though chiefly influenced by Mill and the political philosophy of 19th-century liberalism, Lennstrand found encouragement from the Social Democrats and offered his own support to the Social Democrats, the universal suffrage campaign, and the labor movement. The Social Democrats' emerging leader Hjalmar Branting was a personal friend whom Lennstrand had encountered behind prison bars in the 1880s, when both were serving sentences as blasphemers. The less enthusiastic party activists expressed a wariness that Lennstrand's attacks on religious groups might drive away support from religious supporters of the Social Democrats.

By late summer of 1893 Lennstrand had developed an illness from which he would never manage to recover. He died at a hospital in his native Gävle in 1895. The remains were interred at the family tomb in his native city. Nilsson suggests that the likely cause of Lennstrand's death at 34 was bone necrosis; rumors spread by opponents maintained that God punished him for blasphemous speech by killing him with cancer of the tongue and that he had returned to religion during his dying moments, which Nilsson dismisses as doctors' reports rule out any problem with the oral cavity and witnesses at the side of Lennstrand's deathbed could describe him persevering in his atheistic convictions to the very end.

An obituary in George William Foote's The Freethinker hailed him as "one of the founders and martyrs of organised Freethought in Sweden" whose "imprisonment for blasphemy, and subsequent establishment of the Fritankaren, appealed strongly to the sympathies of English Freethinkers," and as a man worthy of remembrance for "his sufferings and for his efforts to arouse Sweden from her pietistic lethargy."
