= Phil Zuckerman =

Sociologist and professor of sociology and secular studies (born 1969)

Philip Zuckerman
- Born: Philip Joseph Zuckerman; June 26, 1969 (age 57); Los Angeles, California, US

Academic background
- Education: University of Oregon
- Thesis: Opposite Sides of the Street (1998)

Academic work
- Discipline: Sociology
- Institutions: Pitzer College
- Main interests: Secularity; secularization; apostasy; Scandinavian culture
- Website: philzuckerman.com

Philip Joseph Zuckerman is a sociologist and professor of sociology and secular studies at Pitzer College in Claremont, California. He specializes in the sociology of substantial secularity and is the author of eight books, including Beyond Doubt: The Secularization of Society (2023) What It Means to Be Moral: Why Religion Is Not Necessary for Living an Ethical Life (2019).

== Early life and education ==
Born June 26, 1969, to secular Ashkenazi Jewish parents in Los Angeles, California, Zuckerman grew up in Pacific Palisades and studied at Santa Monica College. He transferred to the University of Oregon in Eugene, and there earned a Bachelor of Arts (1992), Master of Arts (1995), and Doctor of Philosophy (1998), all in sociology.

== Career ==
Zuckerman is a professor of sociology and secular studies at Pitzer College in Claremont, California. He is also an affiliated adjunct professor at Claremont Graduate University. He was a guest professor at Aarhus University in Denmark in 2006 and 2010. He serves as the special series editor of the Secular Studies book series published by NYU Press. He is the executive director of Humanist Global Charity, formerly known as Brighter Brains Institute, which works in 51 nations to fund secular education, humanist students, women's collectives, orphans, helplines, and offers internships in Africa and India Development. Zuckerman is on the editorial board of Secularism and Nonreligion and is a convener of the Non-religion and Secularity Research Network Conference. He is also on the editorial board for the journal Secular Studies.

Zuckerman is research editor and a contributing writer at OnlySky, an online platform "dedicated to protecting America’s secular democracy through reality-based journalism, storytelling, and commentary."

His research interests are secularity, atheism, apostasy, and Scandinavian culture.

=== Published work ===
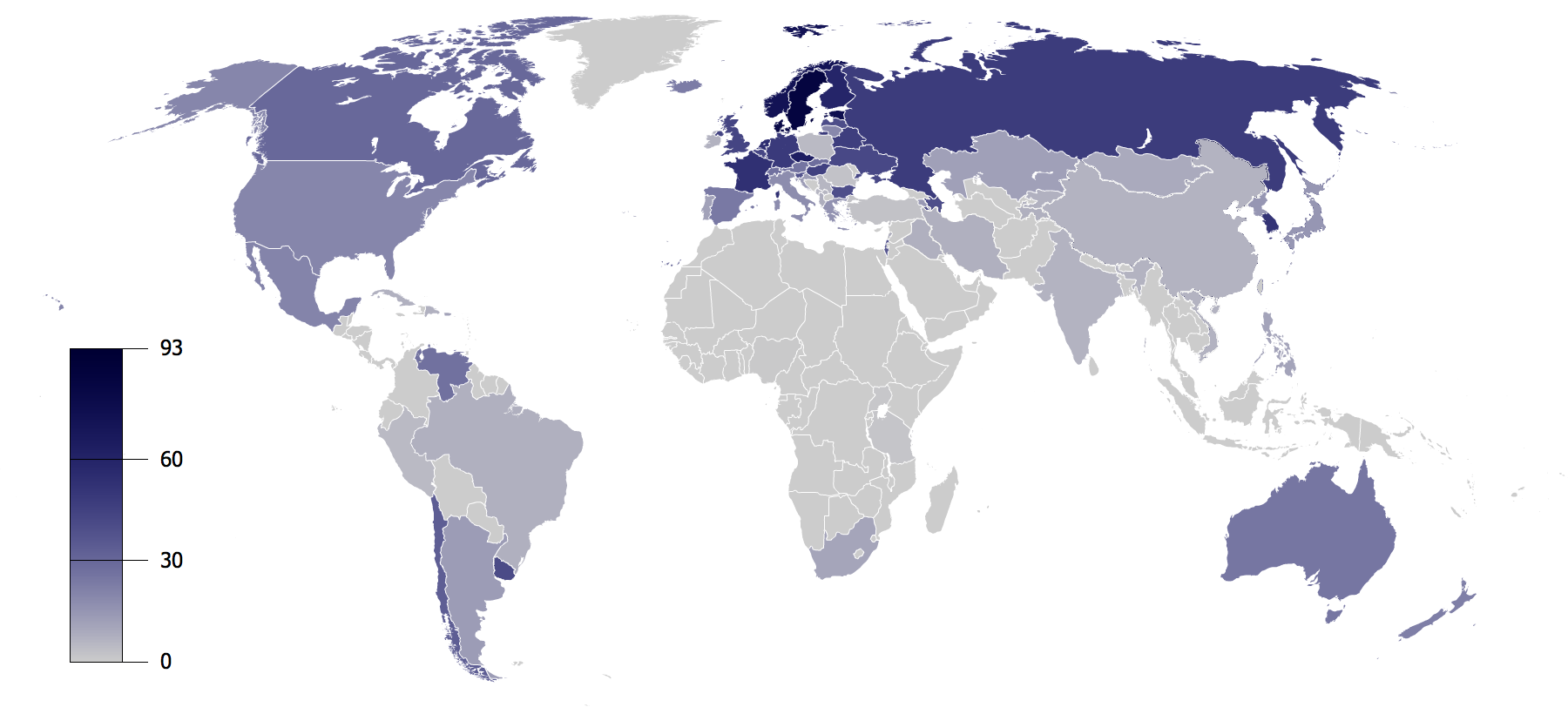
Phil Zuckerman's analysis finds differing levels of atheists and agnostics in countries around the world

Phil Zuckerman is the author of seven books, including The Nonreligious, co-authored with Luke Galen and Frank Pasquale; Living the Secular Life; Faith No More; Society without God; Invitation to the Sociology of Religion; What it Means to be Moral; and Strife in the Sanctuary. His works have been translated into six languages, including Persian, Korean and Turkish.

Phil Zuckerman's 2008 book Society without God notes that Denmark and Sweden, "probably the least religious countries in the world, and possibly in the history of the world", enjoy "among the lowest violent crime rates in the world [and] the lowest levels of corruption in the world". Zuckerman identifies that Scandinavians have "relatively high rates of petty crime and burglary", but "their overall rates of violent crime—such as murder, aggravated assault, and rape—are among the lowest on earth". In 2009, New York Times columnist Peter Steinfels commented that Society Without God provides evidence that an irreligious society can flourish. Society Without God won the silver prize in Foreword magazine's religion book of 2008, and was featured in The New York Times.

Zuckerman's Living the Secular Life: New Answers to Old Questions was released in 2014 and reviewed in The New York Times by Susan Jacoby. Living the Secular Life was designated a "Best Book of 2014" by Publishers Weekly and was featured in a commentary by New York Times columnist David Brooks.

The American Humanist Association has featured Zuckerman as a speaker on rising irreligion in the United States.

=== Public commentary ===
Zuckerman has said that 20 percent of the United States are irreligious and 30 percent of citizens under 30 are. Zuckerman has commented that religion is often conflated with patriotism in the United States. He has stated that while "he applauds the passion and purpose" of American Atheists, they are a minority, as the majority of atheists in America "are not angry, do not hate religion and do not need a forum to vent".

Zuckerman has found that murder rates in Scandinavian countries lowered after abolishing the death penalty, and has opposed the use in the United States.

Zuckerman has found that the religiously unaffiliated tend to be more inclined to progressive politics, and the decline in Protestant Christianity in America is a blow to conservative causes. Zuckerman has commented on the rise of "Jews of no religion", people who identify as being wholly or partially Jewish while having no religion. Zuckerman commented that growing atheist movements in the United States were a response to the impact of the Christian right.

In 2023 he was invited to participate in an Oxford Union debate. He addressed the proposition "This House Believes that God is a Delusion." He suggests that there is no satisfactory single definition of God and asks why any God would oversee a world in which more secular countries enjoy a better standard of living than devout countries.

=== Secular studies program ===
In 2011 he founded and currently chairs the secular studies program at Pitzer. When the secular studies program was announced, the Institute for the Study of Secularism in Society and Culture at Trinity College noted it was the first program to offer a degree in secular studies. The program lets students major in secular studies, including in a core course "Sociology of Secularity". The first student to graduate from Pitzer College with a degree in secular studies was the first student in the United States with such a major.

== Personal life ==
Zuckerman lives in Claremont, California, with his wife and three children.

== Bibliography ==
- Zuckerman, Phil; Kasselstrand, Isabella and Ryan T. Cragun (2023). Beyond Doubt: The Secularization of Society. New York University Press. ISBN 978-1479814282.
- Zuckerman, Phil (2019). What It Means to Be Moral: Why Religion Is Not Necessary for Living an Ethical Life. Berkeley: Counterpoint Press. ISBN 978-1640092747.
- Zuckerman, Phil (2016). The Nonreligious: Understanding Secular People and Societies. London: Oxford University Press. ISBN 9780199924943.
- Zuckerman, Phil (2014). Living the Secular Life: New Answers to Old Questions. London: Penguin Press. ISBN 9781594205088.
- Zuckerman, Phil (2011). Faith no more : why people reject religion. New York: Oxford University Press. ISBN 9780199740017.
- Zuckerman, Phil (2010). Atheism and secularity. Santa Barbara, California: Praeger. ISBN 9780313351815.
- Zuckerman, Phil (2008). Society without God : what the least religious nations can tell us about contentment. New York: New York University Press. ISBN 9780814797143.
- Manning, Christel; Zuckerman, Phil (2005). Sex and religion. Belmont, California: Thomson Wadsworth. ISBN 9780534524937.
- Zuckerman, Phil (2003). Invitation to the Sociology of Religion. New York & London: Routledge. ISBN 9780415941266.

== See also ==
- Religion in Europe
