= WIN/GIA =

International cooperation

Logo

The Worldwide Independent Network/Gallup International Association (WIN/GIA or WIN/Gallup International) was an international cooperation of independent market research and polling firms. The group was created in May 2010 when the Gallup International Association (GIA), created in 1947, and the Worldwide Independent Network of market research (WIN), created in April 2007, started their cooperation. The cooperation ended in 2017.
