= Irreligion =

Absence, indifference to, rejection of or hostility towards religion

Irreligion is the absence or rejection of religious beliefs or practices. It encompasses a wide range of viewpoints drawn from various philosophical and intellectual perspectives, including atheism, agnosticism, religious skepticism, rationalism, secularism, and non-religious spirituality. These perspectives can vary with individuals, who identify as unaffiliated with any religion, holding diverse beliefs about religion and its role in their lives.

Relatively little scholarly research was published on irreligion until around 2010.

== Overview ==
Over the past several decades, the number of secular people has increased, with a rapid rise in the early 21st century, in many countries. In virtually every high-income country and many poor countries, religion has declined. Highly secular societies tend to be societally healthy and successful. Social scientists have predicted declines in religious beliefs and their replacement with more scientific/naturalistic outlooks (secularization hypothesis). According to Ronald Inglehart, this trend seems likely to continue and a reverse rarely lasts long because the trend is driven by technological innovation. However, other researchers disagree (contra-secularization hypothesis). By 2050, Pew Research Center (Pew) expects irreligious people to probably decline as a share of the world population (16.4% to 13.2%), at least for a time, because of faster population growth in highly religious countries and shrinking populations in at least some less religious countries. Many countries may also be gradually becoming more secular, generation by generation. Younger generations tend to be less religious than their elders. They might become more religious as they age, but still be less religious than previous generations if their countries become more affluent and stable. Nonetheless, secularization is compatible with religion since most versions of secularity do not lead to atheism or irreligion. Religious congruence, that is consistency between beliefs and behaviors, in individuals is rare. Religious incongruence is not the same thing as religious insincerity or hypocrisy. The widespread religious congruence fallacy occurs when interpretations or explanations unjustifiably presume religious congruence. This fallacy also informs "New Atheist" critiques of religion.

Estimating the number of irreligious people in the world is difficult. Those who do not affiliate with a religion are diverse. In many countries censuses and demographic surveys do not separate atheists, agnostics and those responding "nothing in particular" as distinct populations, obscuring significant differences that may exist between them. People can feel reasonable anxieties about giving a politically 'wrong' answer – in either direction. Measurement of irreligiosity requires a high degree of cultural sensitivity, especially outside the West, where the concepts of "religion" or "the secular" are not always rooted in local culture and may not even be present. The sharp distinction, and often antagonism, between "religious" and "secular" is culturally and historically unique to the West since in most of human history and cultures, there was little differentiation between the natural and supernatural and concepts do not always transfer across cultures. Forms of secularity always reflect the societal, historical, cultural and religious contexts in which they emerge, and distinctions are sharp in religiously dominant contexts. Also, there's considerable prevalence of atheism and agnosticism in ancient Asian texts. Atheistic traditions have played a significant part in those cultures for millennia. "Cultural religion" must be taken into account: non-religious people can be found in religious categories, especially where religion has very deep-seated religious roots in a culture. Many of the religiously unaffiliated have some religious beliefs and participate in religious practices.

In 2016, Zuckerman, Galen and Pasquale estimated there were 400 million nonreligious or nontheistic people. A 2022 Gallup International Association (GIA) survey, done in 61 countries, reported that 62% of respondents said they are religious, one in four that they aren't, 10% that they're atheists and the rest are not sure. In 2016, it found similar results (62%, 25%, 9% and 5%), also in 2014. People in the European Union, East Asia and Oceania were the least religious. In 2010, according to Pew, the religiously unaffiliated numbered more than 1.1 billion, about one-in-six people (16.3% of an estimated 6.9 billion). 76% of them resided in the 60 countries of Asia-Pacific. China, officially an atheist state and considered to be the world's first or second most populous country, (Note: Depending on whether or not the special administrative regions of Hong Kong, Macau and Taiwan are included in the population statistics of China. The table in the transcluded source excludes all three, referring to the population of Mainland China only.) alone held the majority (62.2% or about 700 million).Shares were relatively similar in three of the six regions: Asia-Pacific (21.2% of more than 4 billion), Europe (18.2% of more than 742 thousands) and North America (17.1% of more than 344 thousands). Men, younger people, and whites, Asians, and people of Jewish heritage are more likely to be secular.

== Etymology ==
Irreligion is either a borrowing from French or from Latin. The term irreligion is a combination of the noun religion and the ir- form of the prefix in-, signifying "not" (similar to irrelevant). It was first attested in French as irréligion in 1527, then in English as irreligion in 1598. It was borrowed into Dutch as irreligie in the 17th century, though it is not certain from which language.

== Definition ==
According to the encyclopedia Britannica, the term irreligion is frequently characterized differently depending on context. Sometimes, surveys of religious belief use lack of identification with a religion as a marker of irreligion. This can be misleading: in some cases a person may identify with a religious cultural institution but not hold the doctrines of that institution or take part in its religious practice.

Some scholars define irreligion as the active rejection of religion, as opposed to the mere absence of religion. The Encyclopedia of Religion and Society defines it as: "Active rejection of religion in general or any of its more specific organized forms. It is thus distinct from the secular, which simply refers to the absence of religion. [...] In contemporary usage, it is increasingly employed as a synonym for unbelief [...]" Sociologist Colin Campbell also describes it as "deliberate indifference towards religion", in his 1971 Towards a Sociology of Irreligion.

The Oxford English Dictionary has two definitions, one of which is labelled obsolete (first published in 1900). It is want of religion; hostility to or disregard of religious principles; irreligious conduct.

The Merriam-Webster Dictionary defines it as "the quality or state of being irreligious" and "irreligious" as "neglectful of religion: lacking religious emotions, doctrines, or practices", also "indicating lack of religion".

Also for "religion", there is no universally agreed-upon definition, even within the social sciences.

== Types ==
- Agnostic atheism is a philosophical position that encompasses both atheism and agnosticism. Agnostic atheists are atheistic because they do not believe in the existence of any deity and agnostic because they claim that the existence of a deity is either unknowable in principle or unknown in fact.
- Agnosticism is the view that the existence of God, the divine, and the supernatural are unknown or unknowable.
- Alatrism or alatry (Greek: from the privative ἀ- + λατρεία (latreia) = worship) is the recognition of the existence of one or more gods, but with a deliberate lack of worship of any deity. Typically, it includes the belief that religious rituals have no supernatural significance and that gods ignore all prayers and worship.
- Anti-clericalism is opposition to religious authority, typically in social or political matters.
- Antireligion is opposition to or rejection of religion of any kind.
- Antitheism is the explicit opposition to theism. The term has had a range of applications. It typically refers to direct opposition to belief in any deity.
- Apatheism is the attitude of apathy or indifference toward the existence or non-existence of any deity.
- Atheism is the lack of belief that any deities exist; in a narrower sense, positive atheism is specifically the position that there are factually no deities. There are ranges of negative and positive atheism.
- "Cultural religion"
- Deism is a philosophical position and rationalistic theology that rejects revelation as a source of knowledge and asserts that empirical reason and observation of the natural world are exclusively logical, reliable, and sufficient to determine the existence of a Supreme Being as the creator of the universe.
- Freethought. It holds that positions regarding truth should be formed on the basis of logic, reason, and empiricism rather than authority, tradition, revelation, or dogma.
- Ietsism is an unspecified belief in an undetermined transcendent reality.
- Ignosticism, also known as igtheism, is the idea that the question of the existence of God is meaningless because the word "God" has no coherent, unambiguous definition.
- Naturalism is the idea or belief that only natural (as opposed to supernatural or spiritual) laws and forces operate in the universe.
- New Atheism is the trenchant approach of some atheist academics, writers, scientists, and philosophers coalescing at the turn of the 21st century, exemplified by Richard Dawkins, Daniel Dennett, Sam Harris, and Christopher Hitchens.
- Nones can be used to refer to those who are unaffiliated with any organized religion. This use derives from surveys of religious affiliation, in which "None" (or "None of the above") is typically the last choice. Since this status can be chosen because of lack of organizational affiliation or lack of personal belief, it is a more specific concept than irreligion. A 2015 Gallup, Inc. poll concluded that in the United States "nones" were growing as a percentage of the population, while Christians were declining and non-Christians also increasing but to a much lesser degree, since the 1950s.
- Nontheism
- Post-theism is a variant of nontheism that proposes that the division of theism and atheism is obsolete and that the God-idea belongs to a stage of human development now past. Within nontheism, post-theism can be contrasted with antitheism.
- Religious skepticism is a type of skepticism about religion.
- Secular ethics is a branch of moral philosophy in which ethics is based solely on human faculties, such as logic, empathy, reason, and ethical intuition, and not derived from belief in supernatural revelation or guidance—a source of ethics in many religions.
- Secular humanism is a system of thought that prioritizes human rather than divine matters.
- Secular liberalism is a form of liberalism in which secularist principles and values, and sometimes non-religious ethics, are especially emphasized.
- Secular paganism is an outlook upholding the virtues and principles of modern paganism while maintaining a secular worldview.
- Secularism is used to describe a political conviction in favor of minimizing religion in the public sphere that may be advocated for regardless of personal religiosity. Sometimes, especially in the United States, it is also a synonym for naturalism or atheism.
- "Spiritual but not religious" (SBNR) is a designation coined by Robert C. Fuller for people who reject traditional or organized religion but have strong metaphysical beliefs. The SBNR may be included under the definition of nonreligion, but are sometimes classified as a wholly distinct group.
- Theological noncognitivism is the argument that religious language—specifically, words such as God—are not cognitively meaningful. It is sometimes considered synonymous with ignosticism.
- Transtheism refers to a system of thought or religious philosophy that is neither theistic nor atheistic but beyond them.

== History ==
In the early 1970s, Colin Campbell began a sociological study of irreligion.

== Human rights ==
In 1993, the United Nations Human Rights Committee declared that article 18 of the International Covenant on Civil and Political Rights "protects theistic, non-theistic and atheistic beliefs, as well as the right not to profess any religion or belief." The committee further stated that "the freedom to have or to adopt a religion or belief necessarily entails the freedom to choose a religion or belief, including the right to replace one's current religion or belief with another or to adopt atheistic views." Signatories to the convention are barred from "the use of threat of physical force or penal sanctions to compel believers or non-believers" to recant their beliefs or convert.

Most democracies protect the freedom of religion or belief, and it is largely implied in respective legal systems that those who do not believe or observe any religion are allowed freedom of thought.

A noted exception to ambiguity, explicitly allowing non-religion, is Article 36 of the Constitution of China (as adopted in 1982), which states that "No state organ, public organization or individual may compel citizens to believe in, or not believe in, any religion; nor may they discriminate against citizens who believe in, or do not believe in, any religion." Article 46 of China's 1978 Constitution was even more explicit, stating that "Citizens enjoy freedom to believe in religion and freedom not to believe in religion and to propagate atheism."

== Demographics ==
Nonreligious population by country, in 2010

Women, when in the labor force, are similar to men in their religiosity. When out of the labor force, women tend to be more religious.

In many countries censuses and demographic surveys do not separate atheists, agnostics and those responding "nothing in particular" as distinct populations. Both "religion" and "secular" are Western concepts and are not universal across cultures, languages, or time.

In 2020, of the global atheist and non-religious population, 78% live in Asia and the Pacific, while the remainder reside in Europe (10%), North America (6%), Latin America and the Caribbean (4%), sub-Saharan Africa (1.5%) and the Middle East and North Africa (.1%). Eleven countries have nonreligious majorities. In 2020, the countries with the highest percentage of "Non-Religious" ("Term encompassing both (a) agnostics; and (b) atheists") were North Korea, the Czech Republic and Estonia. According to the 2018 Chinese General Social Survey, China had the largest count of unaffiliated people: about one billion adults. According to Pew Research in 2025, China alone makes up 67% of the global religiously unaffiliated demographic. Some broadly religious practices continue to play a significant role in the lives of a substantial shares of the Chinese population. The Asia-Pacific region alone accounts for 78% of the global unaffiliated demographic.

Determining objective irreligion, as part of societal or individual levels of secularity and religiosity, requires a high degree of cultural sensitivity from researchers. This is especially so outside the Western world, where the concepts of "religious" and "secular" are not necessarily rooted in local culture or even exist. "Cultural religion" is a vivid reality. It must be taken into account when trying to ascertain the numeric strength of atheism and agnosticism in a country. It is generally not considered more important than self-identification measures. Non-religious people can be found in religious categories. And many of the unaffiliated still hold religious beliefs or practices. This is especially the case where religion has very deep-seated religious roots in a culture, such as with Christianity in Europe, Islam in the Middle East, Hinduism in India, and Buddhism in South-east Asia. For instance, Scandinavian countries have among the highest measures of nonreligiosity and even atheism in Europe. For example, 58% of the Swedish population identify with the Church of Sweden. Yet, 47% of atheists who live in those countries are still formally members of the national churches.

In much of East Asia, ritual behavior holds greater salience than belief. China has state atheism and is a Leninist religious state, which maintains dominance over all other religions. About 85% of its population practice various kinds of religious behaviors with some regularity. Many East Asians identify as "without religion" (wú zōngjiào in Chinese, mu shūkyō in Japanese, mu jong-gyo in Korean), but "religion" in that context refers only to Buddhism or Christianity. Most of the people "without religion" practice Shinto and other folk religions. In the Muslim world, those who claim to be "not religious" mostly imply not strictly observing Islam, and in Israel, being "secular" means not strictly observing Orthodox Judaism. Vice versa, many American Jews share the worldviews of nonreligious people though affiliated with a Jewish denomination, and in Russia, growing identification with Eastern Orthodoxy is mainly motivated by cultural and nationalist considerations, without much concrete belief. In the United States, the majority of the "Nones", those without a religious affiliation, have belief in a god or higher power, spiritual forces beyond the natural world, and souls. Even 23% of self-identified atheists believe in a higher power, but not a god as described in the bible. A 2024 report by Pew on Hong Kong, Japan, South Korea, Taiwan and Vietnam found that though many in those countries are not affiliated with any religion, many of the unaffiliated still have beliefs in gods or unseen beings and engage in religious practices. According to Pew in 2023, many unaffiliated Chinese believe in deities or other religious beliefs and participate in religious practicies.

Secular people are complex and not always devoid of religious or spiritual involvement. They persist in various forms of religiosity and spirituality. "Secular churches" or "atheist churches" such as Sunday Assembly and others have emerged in multiple countries (e.g. USA, Britain, Australia) which deal with community needs that religious services often provide. Atheists are diverse with some engaging spiritual practice and others having strong beliefs in that they seek to evangelize to others. Nontheistic religions such as Buddhism, Jainism, along with atheistic schools in Hinduism, and other Indian schools like Carvaka, Ajivika have played a significant part in Asian cultures for millennia. Anthropologist Jack David Eller states that "atheism is quite a common position, even within religion" and that "surprisingly, atheism is not the opposite or lack, let alone the enemy, of religion but is the most common form of religion." In the Czech Republic, one of the most secular countries in the world, most nonbelievers are not atheists but are more religious skeptics fulfill their spiritual needs outside of traditional religion. The 2024 Meaning Making Survey focused on "religiously unaffiliated" respondents in the US and noted that only 19% of this group held atheistic beliefs. In terms of supernatural beliefs, belief in ghosts was held by 36% of agnostics and 26% of atheists, belief in reincarnation was held by 24% of agnostics and 20% of atheists, belief in an afterlife was held by 25% of agnostics and 15% of atheists.

In 2014, Zuckerman, Galen and Pasquale estimated there were 400 million nonreligious or nontheistic people. In their 2013 essay, Ariela Keysar and Juhem Navarro-Rivera estimated there were about 450 to 500 million nonbelievers, including both "positive" and "negative" atheists, or approximately 7% of the world population. These estimates come from the International Social Survey Programme 2008 survey in which 40 countries took part. In 2010, the religiously unaffiliated numbered more than 1.1 billion (around 1,126,500,000 persons), about one-in-six people (16.3% of an estimated 6,9 billion world population), according to Pew Research Center. In Pew reports, "unaffiliated" are atheists, agnostics, and people who checked "nothing in particular". 76% of them resided in one of the six regions: Asia-Pacific. A 2012 WIN/Gallup International report on a poll from 57 countries reported that 59% of the world's population identified as a religious person, 23% as not a religious person, 13% as "convinced atheists", and also a 9% decrease in identification as "religious" when compared to the 2005 average from 39 countries. A 2015 WIN/Gallup International poll found that 63% of the globe identified as a religious person, 22% as not a religious person, and 11% as "convinced atheists". Their 2016 survey found that 62% of the globe identified as a religious person, less than 25% as not a religious person, 9% others as "convinced atheists" and 5% others "Do not know/no response". Keysar and Navarro-Rivera advised caution with these figures since other surveys have consistently reached lower figures for the number of atheists worldwide.

Inverse association between intelligence and religiosity, and the inverse correlation between intelligence and fertility might lead to a decline in non-religious identity (contra-secularization hypothesis) in the foreseeable future. In 2007, sociologist Phil Zuckerman's global studies on atheism have indicated that global atheism may be in decline due to irreligious countries having the lowest birth rates in the world and religious countries having higher birth rates in general. A Pew 2015 global projection study for religion and nonreligion, projected that between 2010 and 2050, there will be some initial increases of the unaffiliated followed by a decline by 2050. Some theorists think religion will fade away but Pew reveals a more complicated picture. Pew predicts the unaffiliated share of the world population will decrease, at least for a while, from 16.4% to 13.2% by 2050. Pew states that religious areas are experiencing the fastest growth because of higher fertility and younger populations. By 2060, Pew says the number of unaffiliated will increase by over 35 million, but the overall population-percentage will decrease to 13% because the total population will grow faster. This would be mostly because of relatively old age and low fertility rates in less religious societies such as East Asia, particularly China and Japan, but also Western Europe. By 2019, 43 out of 49 countries studied continued to become less religious.

Relatively few unbelievers select 'Atheist' or 'Agnostic' as their preferred (non)religious or secular identity. Being nonreligious is not necessarily equivalent to being an atheist or agnostic. Many of the nonreligious have some religious beliefs. Also, some of the unaffiliated engage in certain kinds of religious practices. For example, "belief in God or a higher power is shared by 7% of Chinese unaffiliated adults, 30% of French unaffiliated adults and 68% of unaffiliated U.S. adults. Being unaffiliated with a religion on polls does not automatically mean objectively nonreligious since there are, for example, unaffiliated people who fall under religious measures, just as some unbelievers may still attend a church or other place of worship. Out of the global nonreligious population, 76.2% reside in Asia-Pacific, while the remainder reside in Europe (12%), North America (5.2%), Latin America and the Caribbean (4%), sub-Saharan Africa (2.4%) and the Middle East and North Africa (0.2%).

=== 2020 Population Estimate ===
Irreligious individuals constitute 24.2% of the global population, with a total population of 1,905,360,000. 88.5% of this irreligious population is concentrated in ten countries, ranked by the size of their respective populations: China, the United States, Japan, Vietnam, Germany, Russia, Brazil, France, the United Kingdom, and South Korea. China hosts more than 1,270,000,000; the United States more than 100,000,000; Japan more than 70,000,000; Vietnam more than 60,000,000; Germany more than 30,000,000; and Russia, Brazil, France, the United Kingdom, and South Korea each contain more than 20,000,000 irreligious individuals.

== Historical trends ==
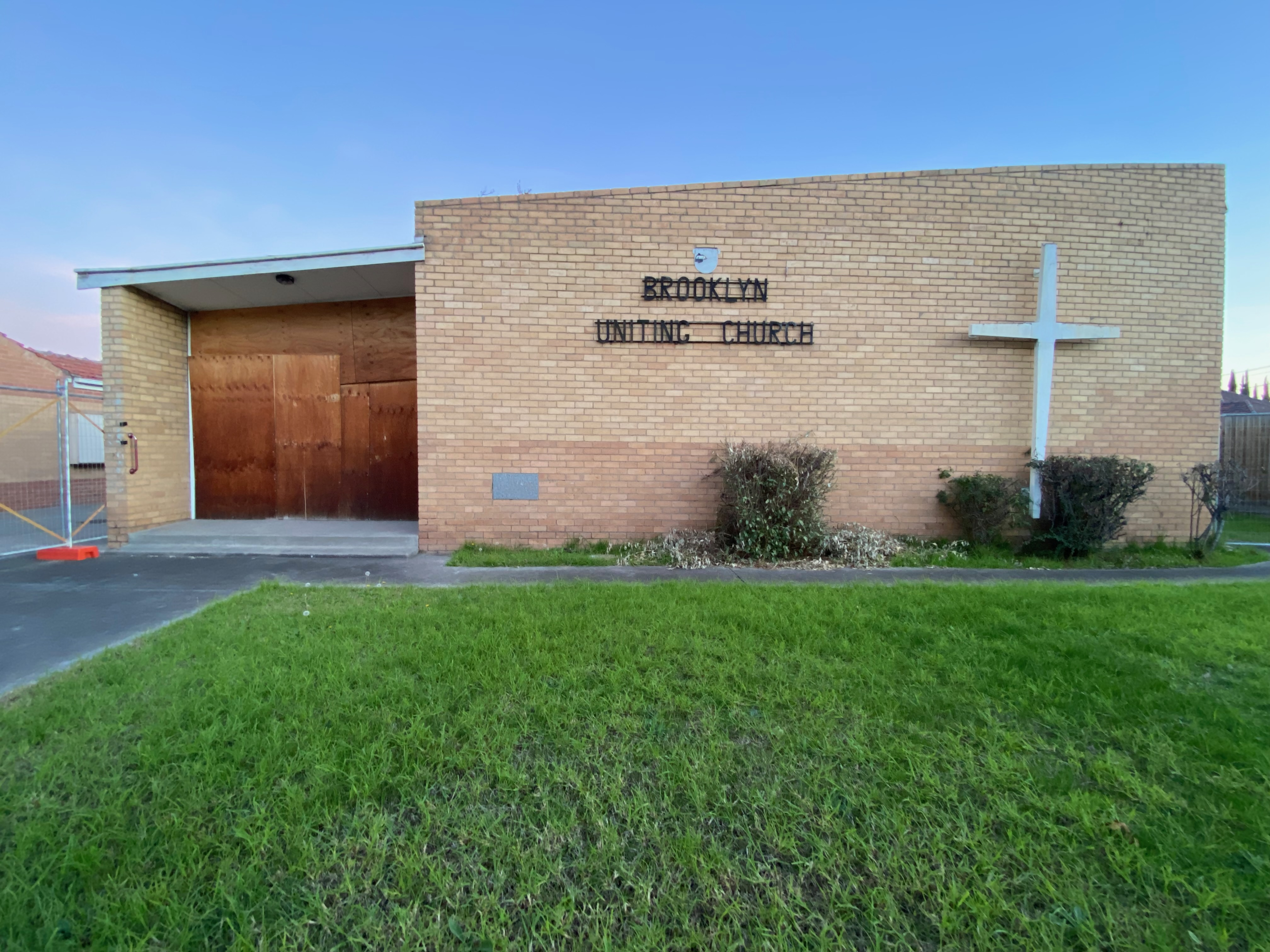
An abandoned church in Australia

Since 2007, there has been a sharp trend away from religion. From about 2007 to 2019, 43 out of 49 countries studied became less religious. Past influential thinkers from Karl Marx to Max Weber to Émile Durkheim thought that the spread of scientific knowledge would dispel religion throughout the world. Industrialization also didn't cause religion to disappear. Political scientists Ronald Inglehart and Pippa Norris argue faith is "more emotional than cognitive", and both advance an alternative thesis termed "existential security." They postulate that rather than knowledge or ignorance of scientific learning, it is the weakness or vulnerability of a society that determines religiosity. They claim that increased poverty and chaos make religious values more important to a society, while wealth and security diminish its role. As need for religious support diminishes, there is less willingness to "accept its constraints, including keeping women in the kitchen and gay people in the closet".

=== Prior to the 1980s ===
Rates of people identifying as non-religious began rising in most societies at least as early as the turn of the 20th century. In 1968, sociologist Glenn M. Vernon wrote that US census respondents who identified as "no religion" were insufficiently defined because they were defined in terms of a negative. He contrasted the label with the term "independent" for political affiliation, which still includes people who participate in civic activities. He suggested this difficulty in definition was partially due to the dilemma of defining religious activity beyond membership, attendance, or other identification with a formal religious group. During the 1970s, social scientists still tended to describe irreligion from a perspective that considered religion as normative for humans. Irreligion was described in terms of hostility, reactivity, or indifference toward religion or as developing from radical theologies.

=== 1981–2019 ===
In a study of religious trends in 49 countries (they contained 60 percent of the world's population) from 1981 to 2007, Inglehart and Norris found an overall, but not universal, increase in religiosity. Respondents in 33 of 49 countries rated themselves higher on a scale from one to ten when asked how important God was in their lives. This increase occurred in most former communist and developing countries. Most high-income countries became less religious. A sharp reversal of the global trend occurred from 2007 to 2019, when 43 out of 49 countries studied became less religious. This reversal appeared across most of the world. The decline in belief was not confined to high-income countries and appeared across most of the world. In virtually every high-income country, religion has continued to decline. At the same time, many poor countries, together with most of the former communist states, have also become less religious. From 2007 to 2019, only five countries became more religious, whereas the vast majority of the countries studied moved in the opposite direction. India is the most important exception to the general pattern of declining religiosity. The United States was a dramatic example of declining religiosity – with the mean rating of importance of religion dropping from 8.2 to 4.6 – while India was a major exception. Research in 1989 recorded disparities in religious adherence for different faith groups, with people from Christian and tribal traditions leaving religion at a greater rate than those from Muslim, Hindu, or Buddhist faiths.

Inglehart and Norris speculate that the decline in religiosity comes from a decline in the social need for traditional gender and sexual norms, ("virtually all world religions instilled" pro-fertility norms such as "producing as many children as possible and discouraged divorce, abortion, homosexuality, contraception, and any sexual behavior not linked to reproduction" in their adherents for centuries) as life expectancy rose and infant mortality dropped. They also argue that the idea that religion was necessary to prevent a collapse of social cohesion and public morality was belied by lower levels of corruption and murder in less religious countries. They argue that both of these trends are based on the theory that as societies develop, survival becomes more secure: starvation, once pervasive, becomes uncommon; life expectancy increases; murder and other forms of violence diminish. As this level of security rises, there is less social/economic need for the high birthrates that religion encourages and less emotional need for the comfort of religious belief. Change in acceptance of "divorce, abortion, and homosexuality" has been measured by the World Values Survey and shown to have grown throughout the world outside of Muslim-majority countries. Several very comprehensive surveys in the Middle East and Iran have come to similar conclusions: there is an increase in secularization and growing calls for reforms in religious political institutions.

== See also ==
- Apostasy
- Atheism
- Faith deconstruction
- Growth of religion
- Importance of religion by country
- Infidel
- Laїcité
- Pantheism
- Secular religion

== Bibliography ==
- Coleman, Thomas J.; Hood, Ralph W.; Streib, Heinz (2018). "An introduction to atheism, agnosticism, and nonreligious worldviews". Psychology of Religion and Spirituality. 10 (3): 203–206. doi:10.1037/rel0000213. S2CID 149580199. Archived from the original on 19 June 2021.
- Arie Johan Vanderjagt, Richard Henry Popkin, ed. (1993). Scepticism and irreligion in the seventeenth and eighteenth centuries. Brill. ISBN 978-90-04-09596-0.
- Eric Wright (2010). Irreligion: Thought, Rationale, History. BiblioBazaar. ISBN 978-1-171-06863-1.
- Dillon, Michele (2015). "Christian Affiliation and Disaffiliation in the United States: Generational and Cultural Change". In Hunt, Stephen J. (ed.). Handbook of Global Contemporary Christianity: Themes and Developments in Culture, Politics, and Society. Brill Handbooks on Contemporary Religion. Vol. 10. Leiden: Brill Publishers. pp. 346–365. doi:10.1163/9789004291027_019. ISBN 978-90-04-26538-7. ISSN 1874-6691.
- Eller, Jack David (2010). "What Is Atheism?". In Zuckerman, Phil (ed.). Atheism and Secularity. Volume 1: Issues, Concepts, Definitions. Santa Barbara, California: Praeger. pp. 1–18. ISBN 978-0-313-35183-9.
- ——— (2017). "Varieties of Secular Experience". In Zuckerman, Phil; Shook, John R. (eds.). The Oxford Handbook of Secularism. New York: Oxford University Press. pp. 499ff. doi:10.1093/oxfordhb/9780199988457.013.31. ISBN 978-0-19-998845-7.
- Glasner, Peter E. (1977). The Sociology of Secularisation: A Critique of a Concept. London: Routledge & Kegan Paul. ISBN 978-0-7100-8455-2.
- Iversen, Hans Raun (2013). "Secularization, Secularity, Secularism". In Runehov, Anne L. C.; Oviedo, Lluis (eds.). Encyclopedia of Sciences and Religions. Dordrecht, Netherlands: Springer. pp. 2116–2121. doi:10.1007/978-1-4020-8265-8_1024. ISBN 978-1-4020-8265-8.
- Josephson, Jason Ānanda (2012). The Invention of Religion in Japan. Chicago: University of Chicago Press. ISBN 9780226412337.
- Lois Lee, Secular or nonreligious? Investigating and interpreting generic 'not religious' categories and populations Archived 28 April 2021 at the Wayback Machine. Religion, Vol. 44, no. 3. October 2013.
- Mullins, Mark R. (2011). "Religion in Contemporary Japanese Lives". In Lyon Bestor, Victoria; Bestor, Theodore C.; Yamagata, Akiko (eds.). Routledge Handbook of Japanese Culture and Society. Abingdon, England: Routledge. pp. 63–74. ISBN 978-0-415-43649-6.
- Schaffner, Caleb; Cragun, Ryan T. (2020). "Chapter 20: Non-Religion and Atheism". In Enstedt, Daniel; Larsson, Göran; Mantsinen, Teemu T. (eds.). Handbook of Leaving Religion. Brill Handbooks on Contemporary Religion. Vol. 18. Leiden: Brill Publishers. pp. 242–252. doi:10.1163/9789004331471_021. ISBN 978-90-04-33092-4. ISSN 1874-6691. Archived from the original on 2 June 2021.
- Smith, James K. A. (2014). How (Not) to Be Secular: Reading Charles Tayor. Grand Rapids, Michigan: Wm. B. Eerdmans Publishing Co. ISBN 978-0-8028-6761-2.
- Taylor, Charles (2007). A Secular Age. Cambridge, Massachusetts: Belknap Press. ISBN 978-0-674-02676-6.
- ——— (2011). "Why We Need a Radical Redefinition of Secularism". In Mendieta, Eduardo; VanAntwerpen, Jonathan (eds.). The Power of Religion in the Public Sphere. New York: Columbia University Press. pp. 34–59. ISBN 978-0-231-52725-5. JSTOR 10.7312/butl15645.6.
- Warner, Michael; VanAntwerpen, Jonathan; Calhoun, Craig, eds. (2010). Varieties of Secularism in a Secular Age. Cambridge, Massachusetts: Harvard University Press. ISBN 978-0-674-04857-7.
- Zuckerman, Phil; Galen, Luke W.; Pasquale, Frank L. (2016). "Secularity Around the World". The Nonreligious: Understanding Secular People and Societies. New York: Oxford University Press. doi:10.1093/acprof:oso/9780199924950.001.0001. ISBN 978-0-19-992494-3.
- Zuckerman, Phil; Shook, John R. (2017). "Introduction: The Study of Secularism". In Zuckerman, Phil; Shook, John R. (eds.). The Oxford Handbook of Secularism. New York: Oxford University Press. pp. 1–17. doi:10.1093/oxfordhb/9780199988457.013.1. ISBN 978-0-19-998845-7.
