= Economy of Italy =

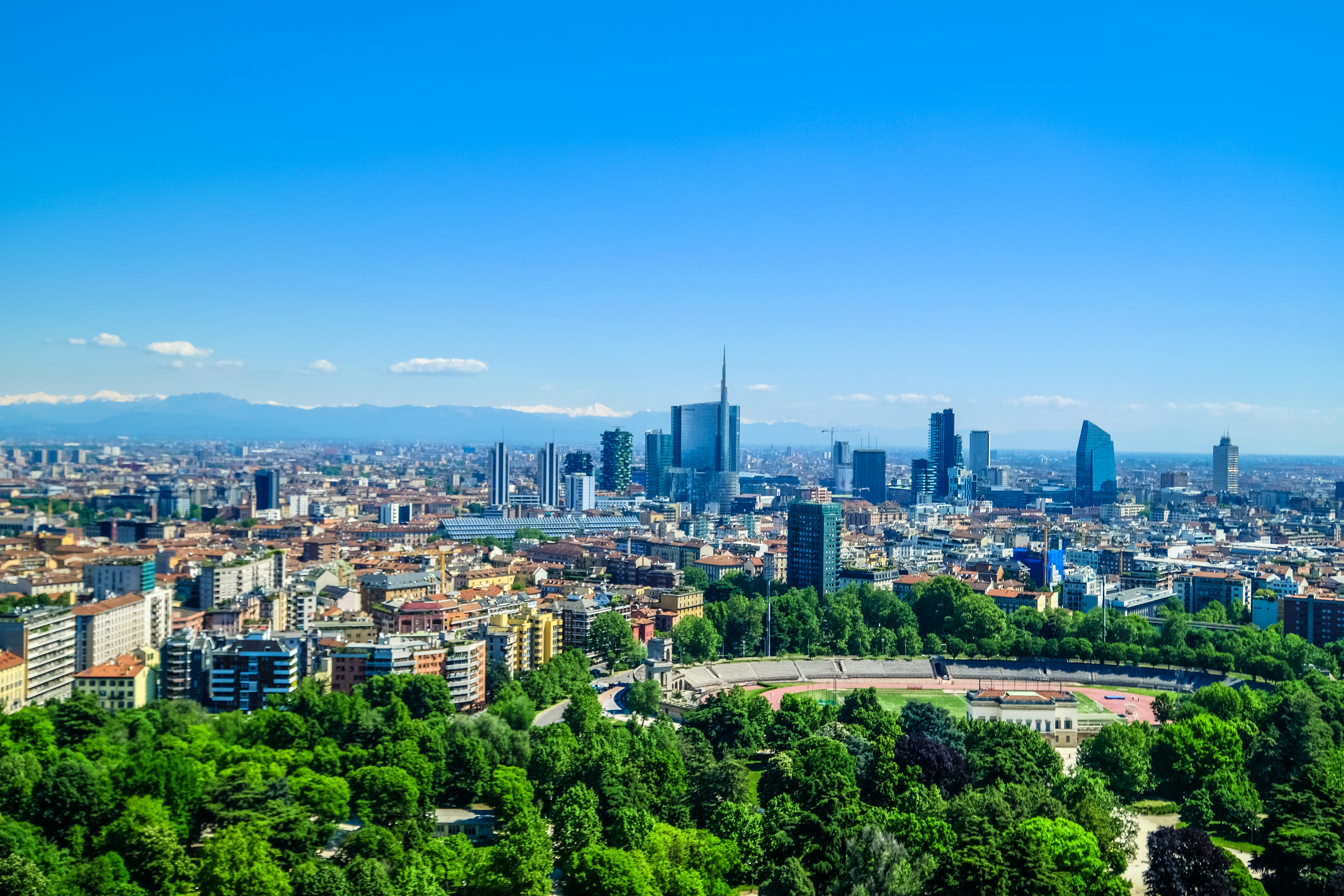
- Milan is the main economic centre of Italy.
- Currency: Euro (EUR, €)
- Fiscal year: Calendar year
- Trade organisations: EU, WTO, G-20, G7, OECD, AIIB
- Country group: Advanced economy; High-income economy; Welfare state

Statistics
- Population: ▼58,915,561 (2025)
- GDP: ▲$2.702 trillion (nominal; 2026); ▲$3.899 trillion (PPP; 2026)
- GDP rank: 9th (nominal; 2026); 12th (PPP; 2026)
- GDP growth: 0.8% (2026); 0.6% (2027); 0.7% (2028)
- GDP per capita: ▲$45,886 (nominal; 2026); ▲$66,221 (PPP; 2026)
- GDP per capita rank: 27th (nominal; 2026); 30th (PPP; 2026)
- GDP per capita growth: 0.7% (2024)
- GDP by sector: Agriculture: 2.0%; Industry: 23.8%; Services: 73.8%; (2017 est.)
- Inflation (CPI): ▲1.5% (2025)
- Population below national poverty line: 9.4% (2021); ▲23.1% at risk of poverty or social exclusion (AROPE 2024)
- Gini coefficient: ▲32.2 medium (2024)
- Human Development Index: ▲0.915 very high (2023) (29th); ▲0.817 very high IHDI (35th) (2023)
- Corruption Perceptions Index: ▼54 out of 100 points (2023) (52nd)
- Labour force: ▼44.1 million (2024); ▲67.1% employment rate (2024)
- Labour force by occupation: Agriculture: 3.9%; Industry: 28.3%; Services: 67.8%; (2011)
- Unemployment: 6.0% (July 2025); 1.753 million unemployed (May 2024)
- Youth unemployment: 20.5% (2025)
- Average gross salary: €2,968 / $3,360 monthly (2024)
- Average net salary: €2,066 / $2,339 monthly (2024)
- Main industries: Machinery; robots; aircraft; aerospace; electronics; defense systems; iron and steel; chemicals; food processing; agribusiness; pharmaceutical; textiles; motor vehicles; clothing; footwear; furniture; ceramics; luxury goods; fashion; tourism; shipbuilding; cruise ship; electric power

External
- Exports: ▲$777.594 billion (9th) (2023)
- Export goods: Engineering products, textiles and clothing, production machinery, motor vehicles, transport equipment, chemicals; foodstuffs, beverages, and tobacco; minerals, nonferrous metals
- Main export partners: Germany 11.9%; France 11.7%; United States 10.1%; Spain 5.3%; Switzerland 4.9%; United Kingdom 4.0%; (2023)
- Imports: ▼$591 billion (2021)
- Import goods: Engineering products, chemicals, transport equipment, energy products, minerals and nonferrous metals, textiles and clothing; food, beverages, tobacco
- Main import partners: Germany 15.2%; France 8.5%; China 7.9%; Netherlands 6.2%; Spain 5.5%; Belgium 4.5%; (2023)
- FDI stock: ▲$552.1 billion (31 December 2017 est.); ▲ Abroad: $671.8 billion (31 December 2017 est.)
- Current account: ▲$59.52 billion (2019 est.)
- Gross external debt: $3.024 trillion (31 December 2020)

Public finance
- Government debt: ▼134.8% of GDP (2023); ▲€2.410 trillion (2019)
- Foreign reserves: ▲$211.3 billion (November 2022 est.)
- Budget balance: €29.3 billion deficit (2019); −1.6% of GDP (2019)
- Revenue: 47.1% of GDP (2019)
- Spending: 48.7% of GDP (2019)
- Economic aid: €28.8 billion from European Structural and Investment Funds (2007–2013); €42.77 billion from European Structural and Investment Funds (2014–2020)
- Credit rating: Standard & Poor's: BBB+; Outlook: Stable; Moody's: Baa2; Outlook: Stable; Fitch: BBB+; Outlook: Stable; Scope: BBB+; Outlook: Positive
- All values, unless otherwise stated, are in US dollars.

Italy has a highly developed social market economy. It is the third-largest national economy in the European Union, the 9th-largest economy in the world by nominal GDP, and the 12th-largest by PPP-adjusted GDP. The country has the second-largest manufacturing industry in Europe and the 7th-largest in the world. Italy has a diversified economy which is dominated by the tertiary service sector. The country is a great power, and is a founding member of the European Union, the eurozone, the Schengen Area, the OECD, the G7 and the G20; it is the eighth-largest exporter in the world, with goods and services worth $611 billion exported in 2021. Its primary trade partners are the other countries of the European Union, with whom it conducts about 59% of its total trade. Its largest trading partners are Germany (12.5%) and France (10.3%), followed by the United States (9%), Spain (5.2%), the United Kingdom (5.2%) and Switzerland (4.6%).

In the post-World War II period, Italy saw a transformation from an agricultural-based economy which had been severely affected by the consequences of the World Wars, into one of the world's most advanced nations, and a leading country in world trade and exports. According to the Human Development Index, the country enjoys a very high standard of living. According to The Economist, Italy has the world's 8th highest quality of life. Italy owns the world's third-largest gold reserve, and is the third-largest net contributor to the budget of the European Union. Furthermore, the advanced country private wealth is one of the largest in the world. In terms of private wealth, Italy ranks second, after Hong Kong, in private wealth to GDP ratio. Among OECD members, Italy has a highly efficient and strong social security system, which comprises roughly 24.4% of GDP.

Italy is the world's seventh-largest manufacturing country, characterised by a smaller number of global multinational corporations than other economies of comparable size and many dynamic small and medium-sized enterprises, notoriously clustered in several industrial districts, which are the backbone of the Italian economy. Italy is a large manufacturer and exporter of a significant variety of products. Its products include machinery, vehicles, pharmaceuticals, furniture, food and clothing. Italy has a significant trade surplus. The country is also well known for its influential and innovative business economic sector, an industrious and competitive agricultural sector (Italy is the world's largest wine producer), and manufacturers of creatively designed, high-quality products: including automobiles, ships, home appliances, and designer clothing. Italy is the largest hub for luxury goods in Europe and the third-largest luxury hub globally. Italy has a strong cooperative sector, with the largest share of the population (4.5%) employed by a cooperative in the EU.

Despite these important achievements, the country's economy today suffers from few structural and non-structural problems. Annual growth rates have often been below the EU average. Massive government spending from the 1980s onwards has produced a severe rise in public debt. In addition, Italian living standards are extremely high on average, but have a considerable North–South divide: the average GDP per capita in the much richer Northern Italy significantly exceeds the EU average, while some regions and provinces in Southern Italy are significantly below the average. In Central Italy, GDP per capita is instead average. In recent years, Italy's GDP per capita growth slowly caught-up with the eurozone average, while its employment rate also did. However, economists dispute the official figures because of the large number of informal jobs (estimated to be between 10% and 20% of the labour force) that lift the inactivity or unemployment rates. The shadow economy is highly represented in Southern Italy, while it becomes less intense as one moves north. In real economic conditions, Southern Italy almost matches Central Italy's level.

== History ==
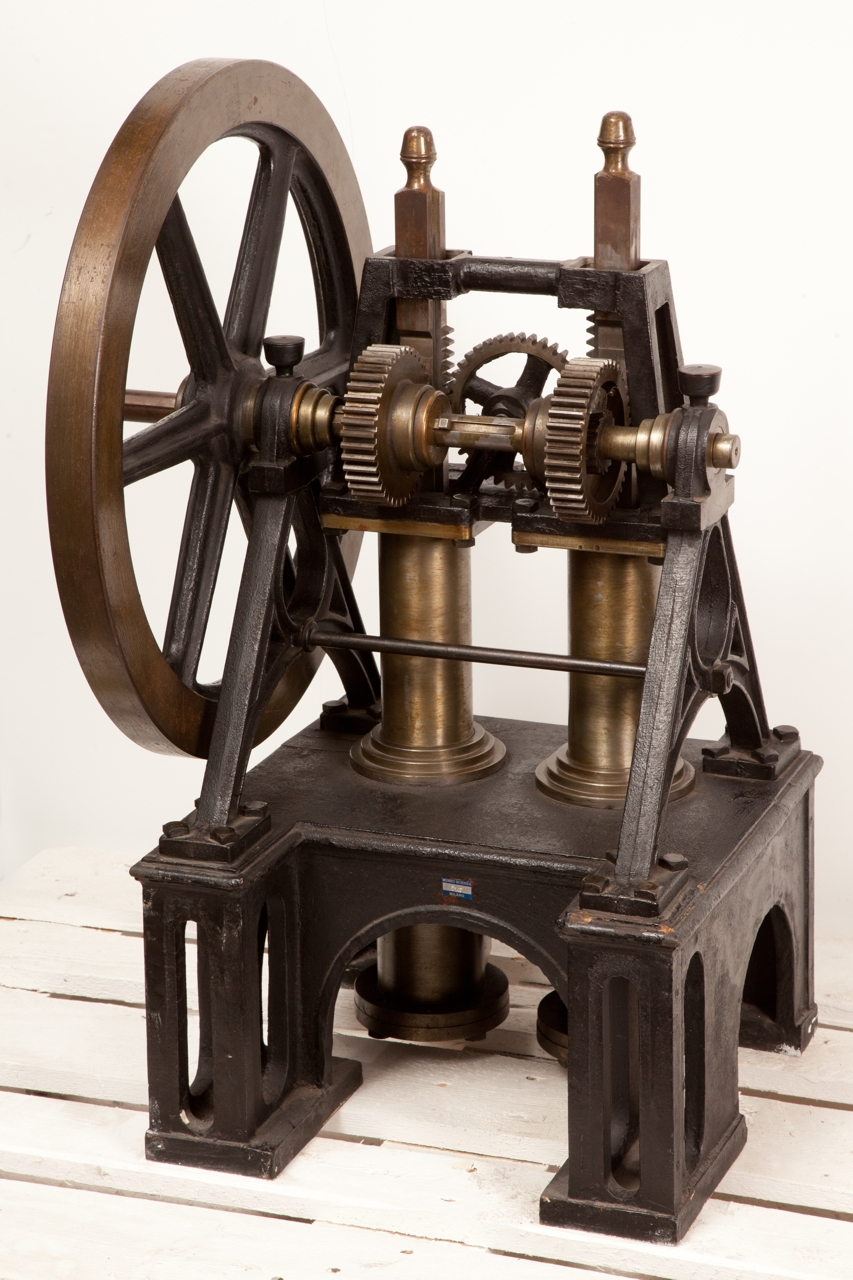
The Barsanti-Matteucci engine, the first proper internal combustion engine

The Italian Renaissance brought Venice and Genoa to the forefront of national trade, first as maritime republics and then as regional states, followed by Milan, Florence, and the rest of northern Italy. Reasons for their early development are for example the relative military safety of Venetian lagoons, the high population density and the institutional structure which inspired entrepreneurs. The Republic of Venice was the first real international financial center, which slowly emerged from the 9th century to its peak in the 15th century. Tradeable bonds as a commonly used type of security, were invented by the Italian city-states (such as Venice and Genoa) of the late medieval and early Renaissance periods.

After 1600 Italy experienced an economic catastrophe. In 1600 Northern and Central Italy comprised one of the most advanced industrial areas of Europe. There was an exceptionally high standard of living. By 1870 Italy was an economically backward and depressed area; its industrial structure had almost collapsed, its population was too high for its resources, its economy had become primarily agricultural. Wars, political fractionalization, limited fiscal capacity and the shift of world trade to north-western Europe and the Americas were key factors.

The economic history of Italy after 1861 can be divided in three main phases: an initial period of struggle after the unification of the country, characterised by high emigration and stagnant growth; a central period of robust catch-up from the 1890s to the 1980s, interrupted by the Great Depression of the 1930s and the two world wars; and a final period of sluggish growth that has been exacerbated by a double-dip recession following the 2008 global financial crush, and from which the country is slowly reemerging only in recent years.

=== Age of industrialization ===
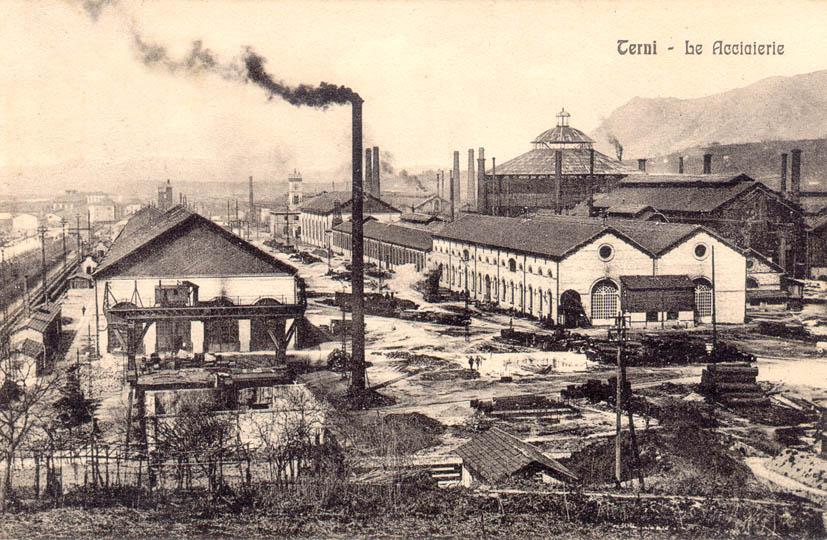
Terni steel mills in 1912

Prior to unification, the economy of the many Italian statelets was overwhelmingly agrarian; however, the agricultural surplus produced what historians call a "pre-industrial" transformation in North-western Italy starting from the 1820s, that led to a diffuse, if mostly artisanal, concentration of manufacturing activities, especially in Piedmont-Sardinia under the liberal rule of the Count of Cavour.

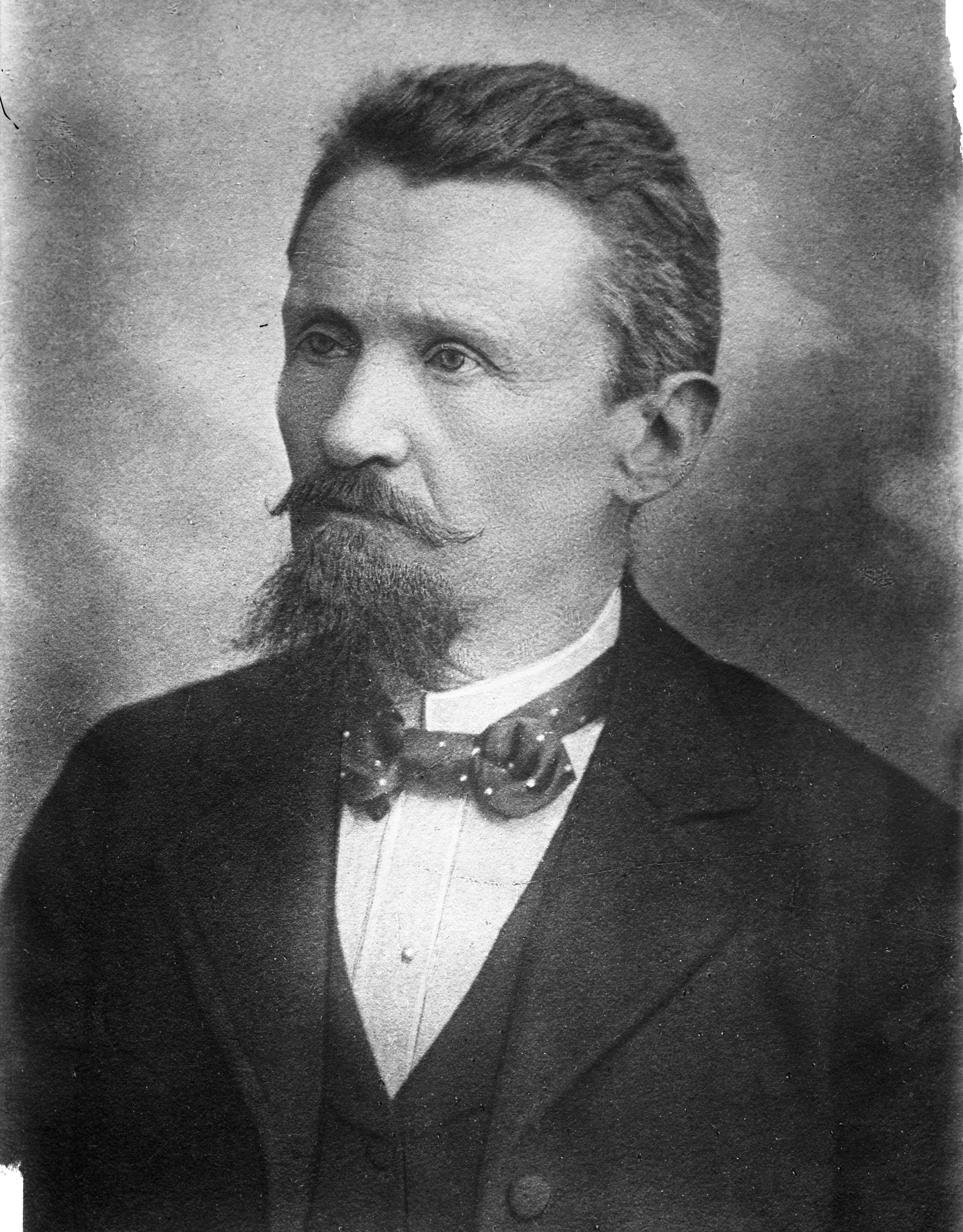
Alessandro Cruto, creator of the first practical long-lasting incandescent light bulb

After the birth of the unified Kingdom of Italy in 1861, there was a deep consciousness in the ruling class of the new country's backwardness, given that the per capita GDP expressed in PPS terms was roughly half of that of Britain and about 25% less than that of France and Germany. During the 1860s and 1870s, the manufacturing activity was backward and small-scale, while the oversized agrarian sector was the backbone of the national economy. The country lacked large coal and iron deposits and the population was largely illiterate. In the 1880s, a severe farm crisis led to the introduction of more modern farming techniques in the Po valley, while from 1878 to 1887 protectionist policies were introduced with the aim to establish a heavy industry base. Some large steel and iron works soon clustered around areas of high hydropower potential, notably the Alpine foothills and Umbria in central Italy, while Turin and Milan led a textile, chemical, engineering and banking boom and Genoa captured civil and military shipbuilding.

However, the diffusion of industrialisation that characterised the northwestern area of the country largely excluded Venetia and, especially, the South. The resulting Italian diaspora concerned up to 26 million Italians, the most part in the years between 1880 and 1914; by many scholars, it is considered the biggest mass migration of contemporary times. During the Great War, the still frail Italian state successfully fought a modern war, being able of arming and training some 5 million recruits. But this result came at a terrible cost: by the end of the war, Italy had lost 700,000 soldiers and had a ballooning sovereign debt amounting to billions of lira.

=== Fascist regime (1922–1943) ===
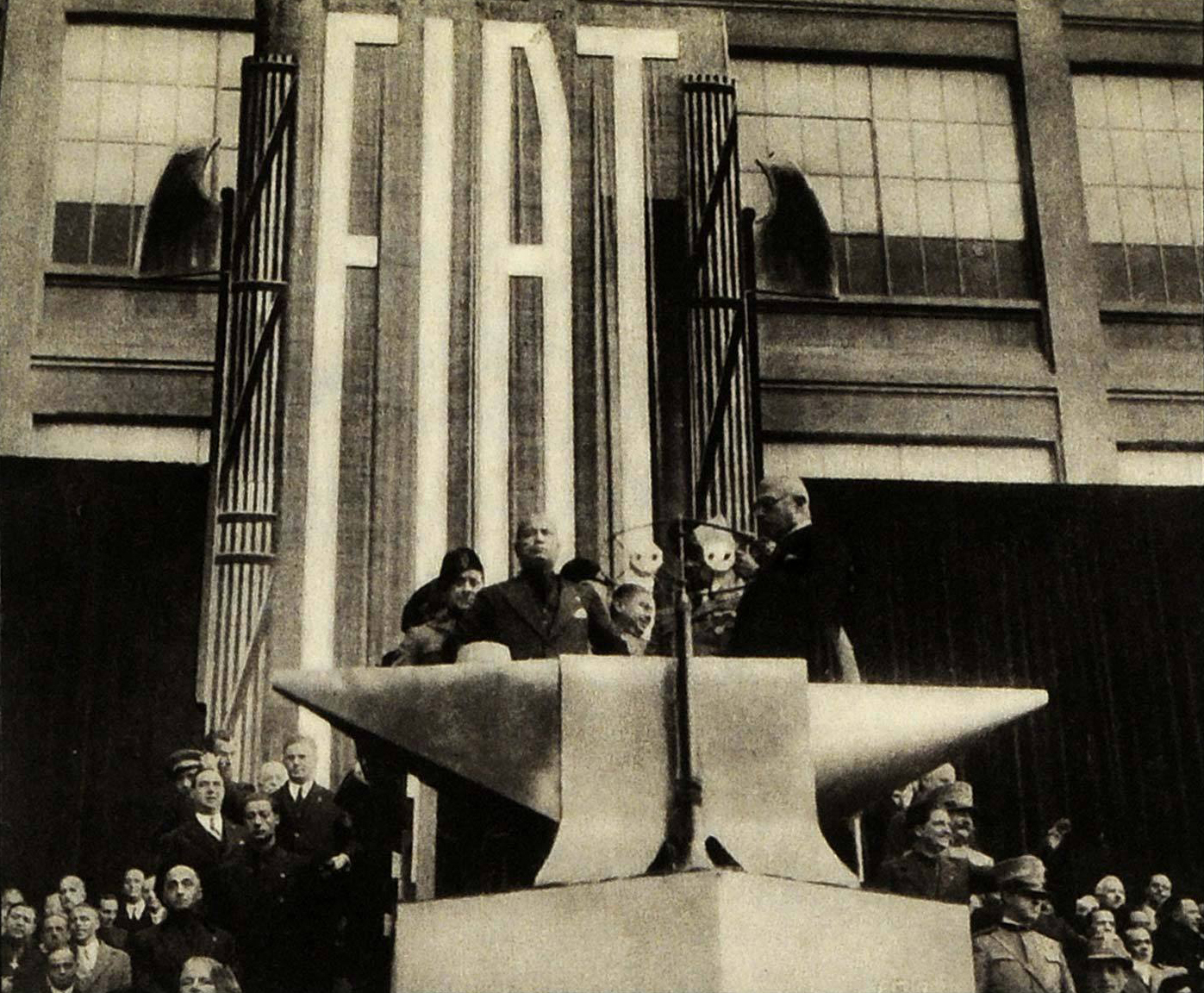
Benito Mussolini giving a speech at the Fiat Lingotto factory in Turin, 1932

Italy emerged from World War I in a poor and weakened condition. The National Fascist Party of Benito Mussolini came to power in 1922, at the end of a period of social unrest. However, once Mussolini acquired a firmer hold of power, laissez-faire and free trade were progressively abandoned in favour of government intervention and protectionism.

In 1929, Italy was hit hard by the Great Depression. In order to deal with the crisis, the Fascist government nationalized the holdings of large banks which had accrued significant industrial securities, establishing the Istituto per la Ricostruzione Industriale. A number of mixed entities were formed, whose purpose was to bring together representatives of the government and of the major businesses. These representatives discussed economic policy and manipulated prices and wages so as to satisfy both the wishes of the government and the wishes of business.

This economic model based on a partnership between government and business was soon extended to the political sphere, in what came to be known as corporatism. At the same time, the aggressive foreign policy of Mussolini led to increasing military expenditure. After the invasion of Ethiopia, Italy intervened to support Franco's nationalists in the Spanish Civil War. By 1939, Italy had the highest percentage of state-owned enterprises after the Soviet Union.

=== War economy (1939–1943) ===
Italy's involvement in World War II as a member of the Axis powers required the establishment of a war economy. The Allied invasion of Italy in 1943 eventually caused the Italian political structure – and the economy – to rapidly collapse. The Allies, on the one hand, and the Germans on the other, took over the administration of the areas of Italy under their control. By the end of the war, Italian per capita income was at its lowest point since the beginning of the 20th century.

=== Post-war economy (1945–1947) ===
Italy emerged from World War II as a devastated and defeated country, deeply torn apart first by war and then by civil war, between communists returning from the partisan war and fascists recovering from defeat. Free Italy renounced and rejected fascist ideology and renounced the monarchy and the king, embracing the republic as a new form of democratic government through the 1946 Italian institutional referendum. The economy slowly recovered amidst the ruins, with a spirit of hope, but many Italians emigrated. The Italian Republic takes its first steps towards the reconstruction of the country, guided by a new Constitution of Italy.

=== Post-war reconstruction (1948–1955) ===
After the end of World War II, Italy was in rubble and occupied by foreign armies, a condition that worsened the chronic development gap among the more advanced European economies. However, the new geopolitical logic of the Cold War made possible that the former enemy Italy, a hinge country between Western Europe and the Mediterranean, and now a new, fragile democracy threatened by the NATO occupation forces, the proximity of the Iron Curtain and the presence of a strong Communist party, was considered by the United States as an important ally for the Free World, and received under the Marshall Plan over US$1.2 billion from 1947 to 1951.

The end of aid through the Plan could have stopped the recovery but it coincided with a crucial point in the Korean War whose demand for metal and manufactured products was a further stimulus of Italian industrial production.

=== Economic rebuild (1956–1959) ===
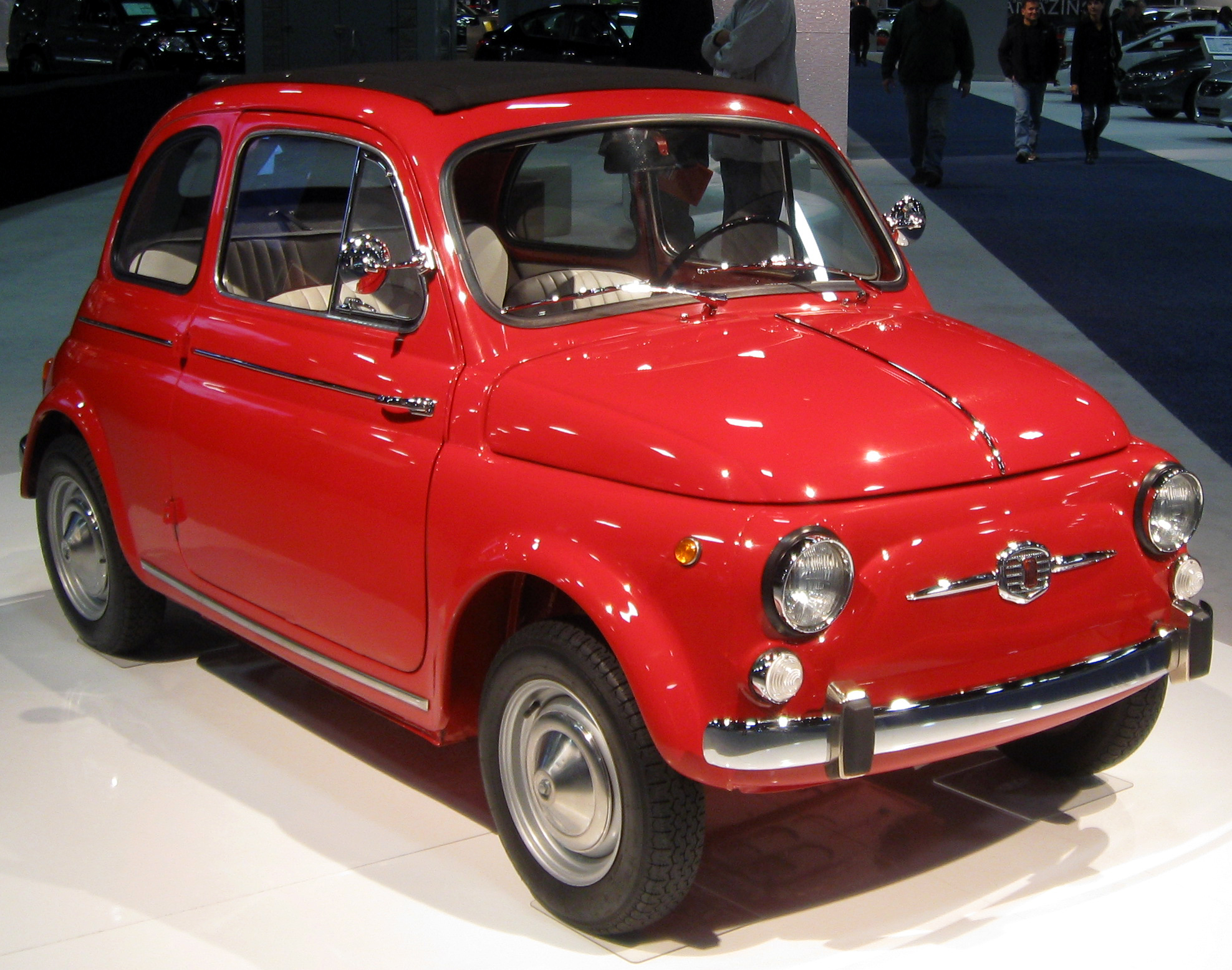
The Fiat 500, launched in 1957, is considered a symbol of Italy's postwar economic miracle.

In the mid-1950s, Italy consolidated its economy. The reconstruction industry did not stop, but rather accelerated. In these years some Italians, a minority, who had emigrated returned to their homeland. Furthermore, the creation of the European Common Market in 1957, with Italy as a founding member, provided more investment and facilitated exports. This led to an expansion that would lead to a true economic boom.

=== Economic miracle (1960–1970) ===
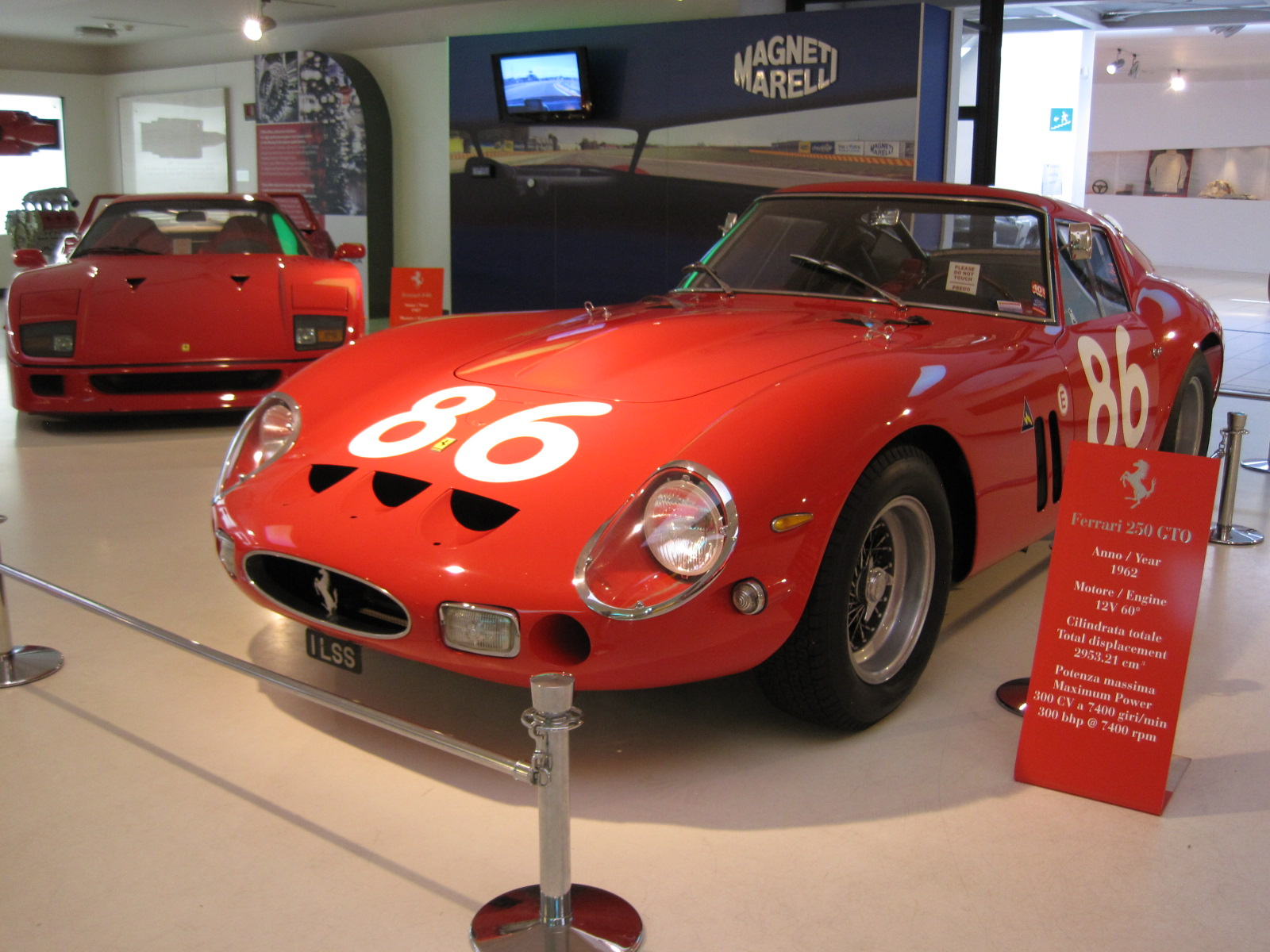
In 1962, Ferrari built the Ferrari 250 GTO, one of its most iconic cars ever, representing an Italian economy that strived to grow ever faster. The automotive industry, starting in the 1960s, would make a significant contribution to the economic miracle.

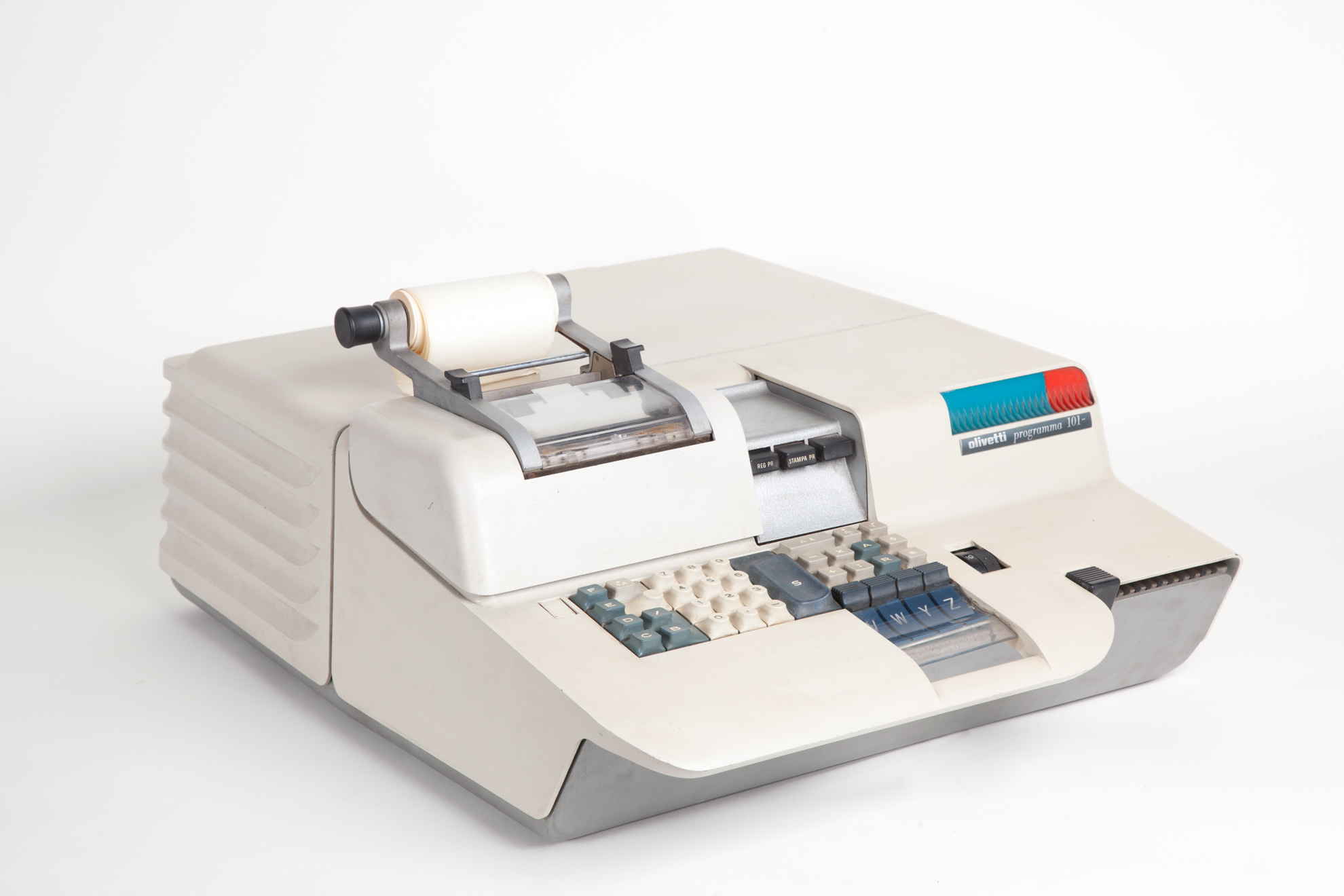
Programma 101, developed in 1965 by Olivetti, is considered one of the first programmable calculators ever and was an economic success internationally.

These favourable developments, combined with the presence of a large labour force, laid the foundation for spectacular economic growth that lasted almost uninterrupted until the "Hot Autumn's" massive strikes and social unrest of 1969–70, which then combined with the later 1973 oil crisis and put an abrupt end to the prolonged boom. It has been calculated that the Italian economy experienced an average rate of growth of GDP of 5.8% per year between 1951 and 1963, and 5% per year between 1964 and 1973. Italian rates of growth were second only, but very close, to the West German rates, in Europe, and among the OEEC countries only Japan had been doing better.

=== The 1970s and 1980s: from stagflation to "il sorpasso" ===
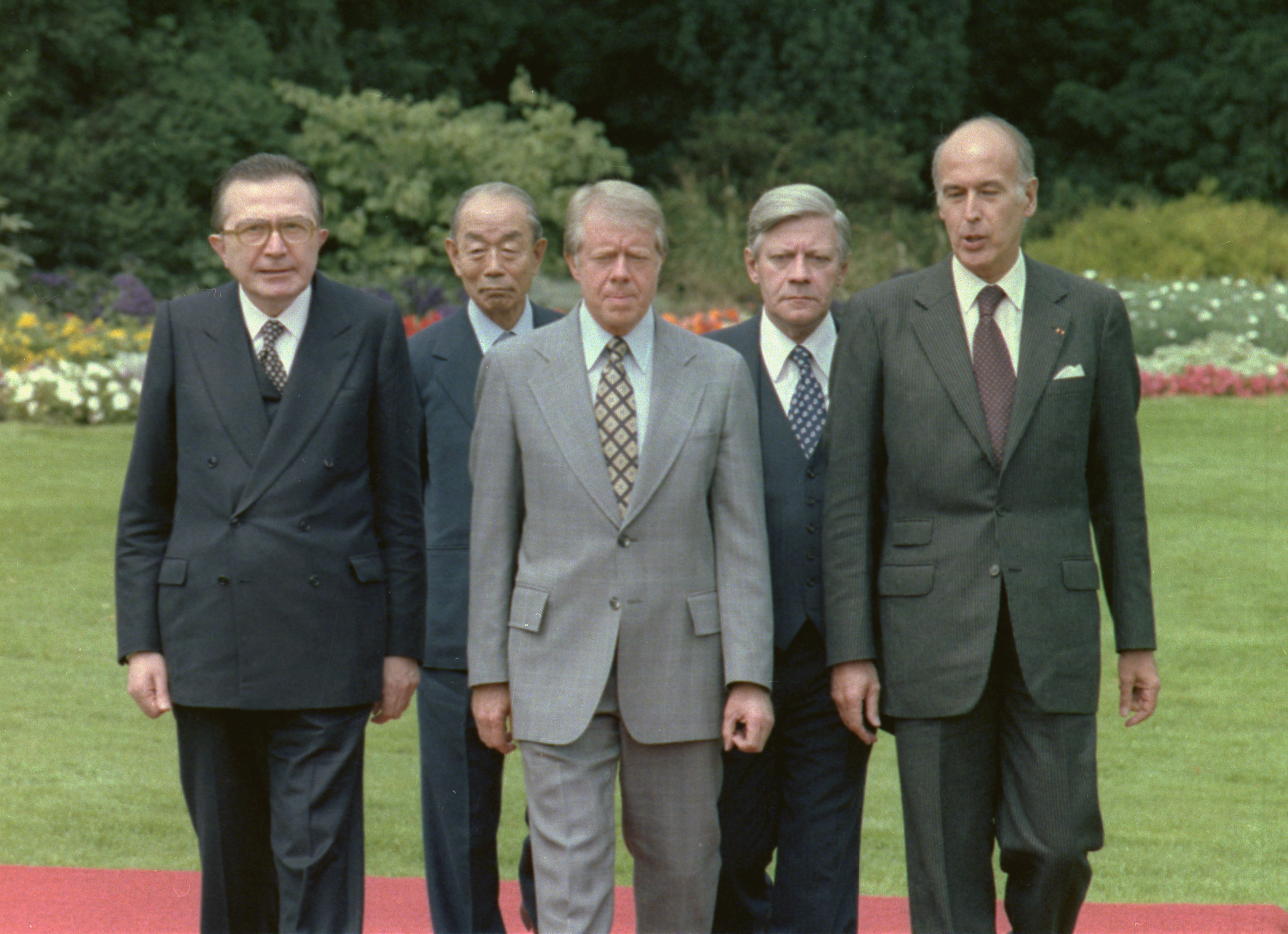
Prime Minister Giulio Andreotti (far left) with G7 leaders in Bonn, 1978

The 1970s were a period of economic, political turmoil and social unrest in Italy, known as Years of lead. Unemployment rose sharply, especially among the young, and by 1977 there were one million unemployed people under the age of 24. Inflation continued, aggravated by the increases in the price of oil in 1973 and 1979. The budget deficit became permanent and intractable, averaging about 10 per cent of the gross domestic product (GDP), higher than any other industrial country. The lira fell steadily, from Lire 560 to the U.S. dollar in 1973 to Lire 1,400 in 1982.

The economic recession went on into the mid-1980s until a set of reforms led to the independence of the Bank of Italy and a big reduction of the indexation of wages that strongly reduced inflation rates, from 20.6% in 1980 to 4.7% in 1987. The new macroeconomic and political stability resulted in a second, export-led "economic miracle", based on small and medium-sized enterprises, producing clothing, leather products, shoes, furniture, textiles, jewellery, and machine tools. As a result of this rapid expansion, in 1987 Italy overtook the UK's economy (an event known as il sorpasso), becoming the fourth richest nation in the world, after the US, Japan and West Germany. The Milan stock exchange increased its market capitalization more than fivefold in the space of a few years.

However, the Italian economy of the 1980s presented a problem: it was booming, thanks to increased productivity and surging exports, but unsustainable fiscal deficits drove the growth. In the 1990s, the new Maastricht criteria boosted the urge to curb the public debt, already at 104% of GDP in 1992. The consequent restrictive economic policies worsened the impact of the global recession already underway. After a brief recovery at the end of the 1990s, high tax rates and red tape caused the country to stagnate between 2000 and 2008.

=== The Great Recession (2008–2013) ===
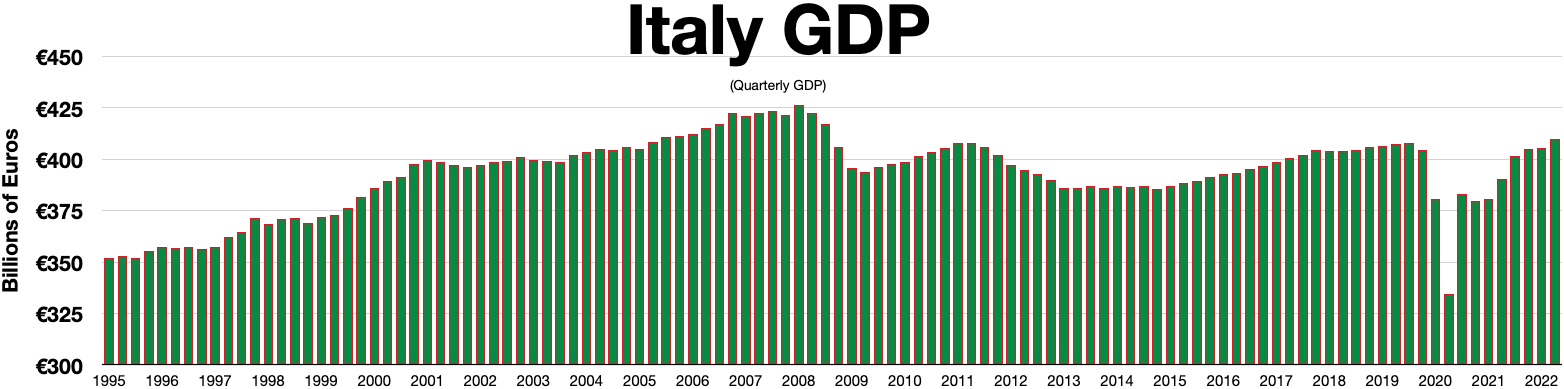
Italy real quarterly GDP

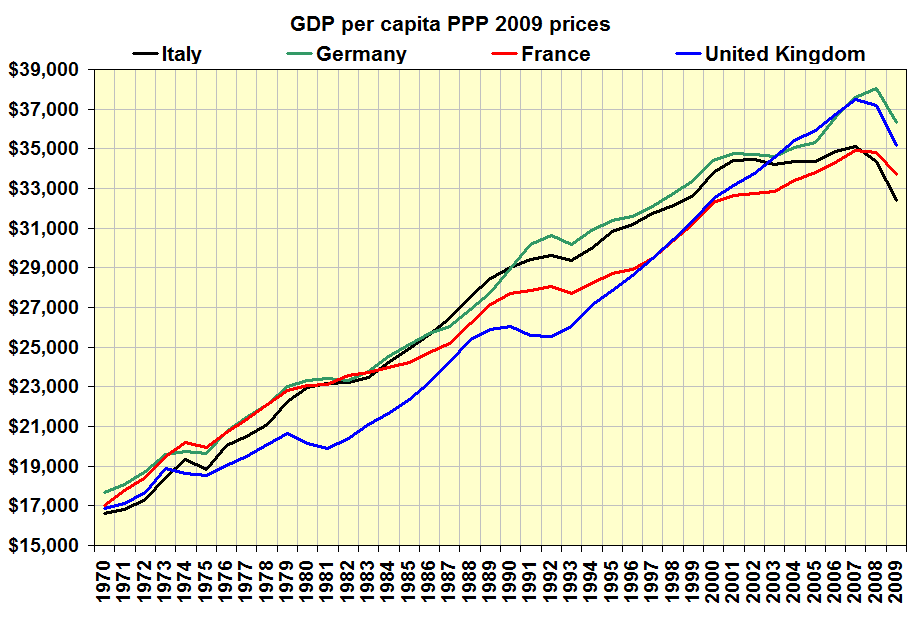
GDP per capita of Italy, France, Germany and Britain from 1970 to 2008

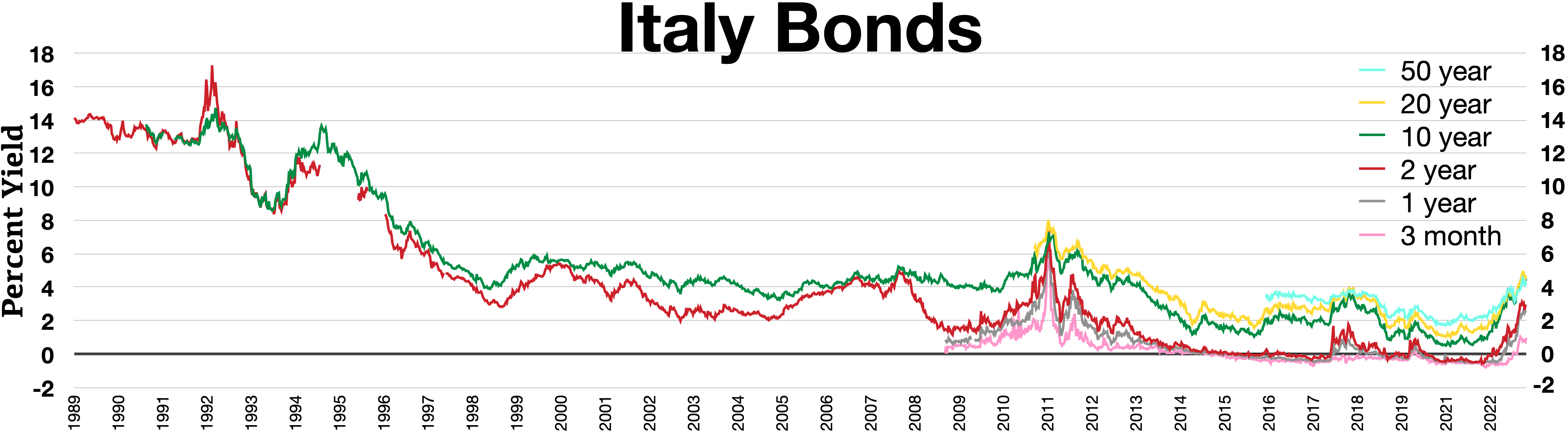
Italy bonds European debt crisis in 2011 negative interest rates 2015–2022 50 year 20 year 10 year 2 year 1 year 3 month

Italy was among the countries hit hardest by the Great Recession of 2008–2009 and the subsequent European debt crisis. The national economy shrunk by 6.76% during the whole period, totaling seven-quarters of recession. In November 2011 the Italian bond yield was 6.74 per cent for 10-year bonds, nearing a 7 per cent level where Italy is thought to lose access to financial markets. According to Eurostat, in 2015 the Italian government debt stood at 128% of GDP, ranking as the second biggest debt ratio after Greece (with 175%). However, the biggest chunk of Italian public debt is owned by Italian nationals and relatively high levels of private savings and low levels of private indebtedness are seen as making it the safest among Europe's struggling economies. As a shock therapy to avoid the debt crisis and kick-start growth, the national unity government led by the economist Mario Monti launched a program of massive austerity measures, that brought down the deficit but precipitated the country in a double-dip recession in 2012 and 2013, receiving criticism from numerous economists.

=== Economic recovery (2014–2019) ===
In the period 2014–2019, the economy partially recovered from the disastrous losses incurred during the Great Recession, primarily thanks to strong exports, but nonetheless, growth rates remained well below the Euro area average, meaning that Italy's GDP in 2019 was still 5 per cent below its level in 2008.

=== Economic impact of COVID-19 pandemic (2020–2021) ===
Starting from February 2020, Italy was the first country of Europe to be severely affected by the COVID-19 pandemic, that eventually expanded to the rest of the world. The economy suffered a massive shock as a result of the lockdown of most of the country's economic activity. After three months, at the end of May 2020, the pandemic was put under control, and the economy started to recover, especially, the manufacturing sector. Overall, it remained surprisingly resilient, although GDP plummeted like in most western countries. The Italian government issued special treasury bills, known as BTP Futura as a COVID-19 emergency funding, waiting for the approval of the E.U. response to the outbreak. Eventually, in July 2020, the European Council approved the 750 billion € Next Generation EU fund, of which €209 billion will go to Italy.

Despite the hard times faced during COVID, Italy's economy had a better recovery after COVID than after the Great Recession. Policies were understandably stricter during the Great Recession causing growth to be more difficult. As a result of the 2008 Financial Crisis, fiscal policy declined, revenue and profits fell, unemployment doubled, household disposable income fell, and a lot of businesses went bankrupt. In comparison, as a result of the COVID pandemic, fiscal response was countercyclical as opposed to procyclical during the Great Recession, investment eventually boosted, and there were less strict credit standards. All of these things plus more helped Italy's economy recover better post-pandemic as opposed to post-Great Recession. While these are only a few examples, they help explain why Italy was able to recover better after the recession caused by COVID than after the Great Recession.

=== Economic resilience (2022–2024) ===
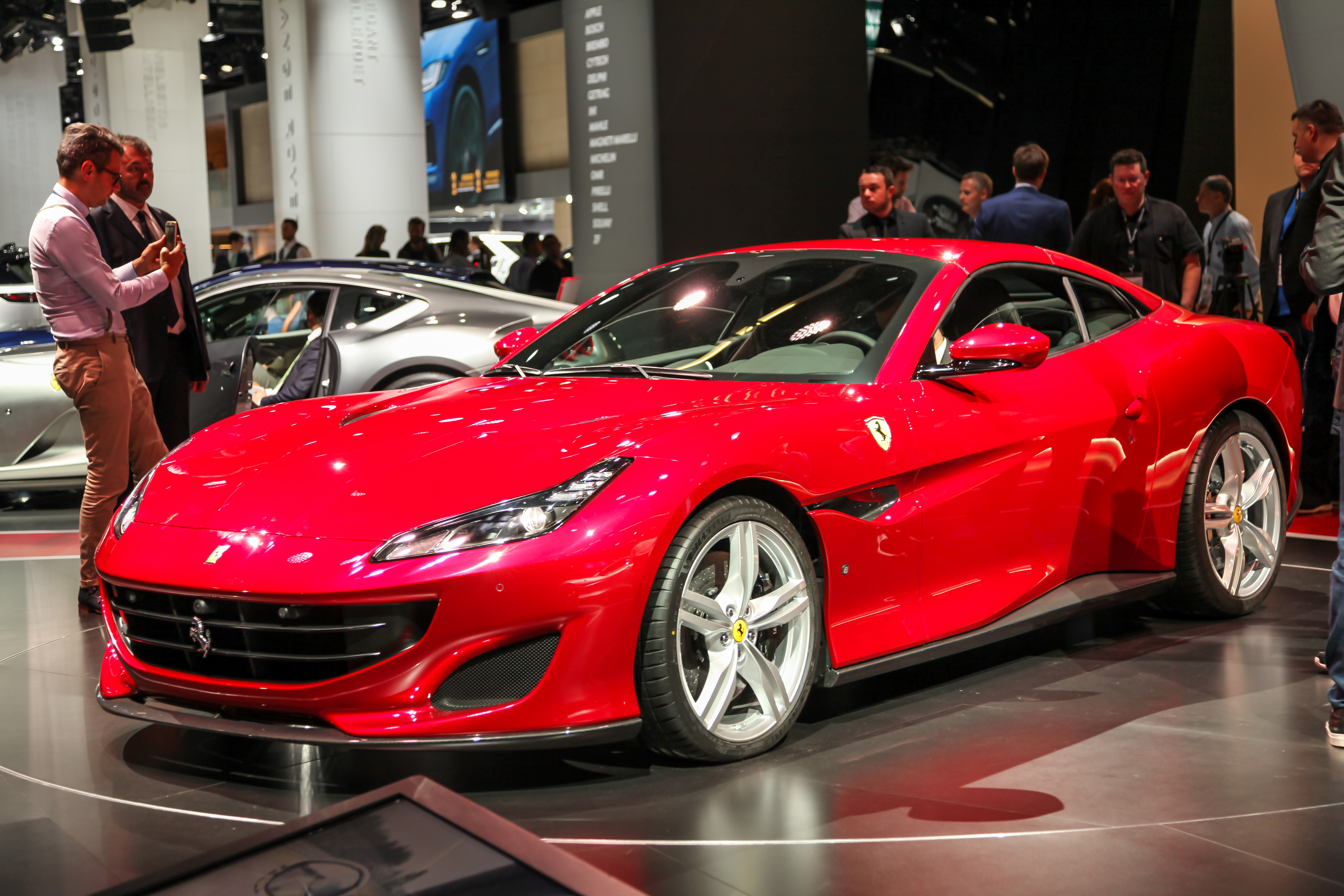
The Ferrari Portofino represents the synergy of "Made in Italy" brands that strengthens the Italian economy.

Beginning in 2022, after the COVID-19 pandemic, Italy restarted with a resilient economy which nonetheless had to face the global energy crisis of 2021-2023, involving an increase in gas and other energy prices due to the Russian invasion of Ukraine on 24 February 2022. This crisis created the need to find an alternative supplier to Russia, subject to European Union sanctions. With rising energy prices, inflation rose in Europe, which was addressed by the European Central Bank with a progressive increase in interest rates. Furthermore, the PNRR (Piano Nazionale di Ripresa e Resilienza) had to be re-calibrated and re-agreed with the European Union, to address the new geopolitical situation which led to the energy crisis and damage to supply chains, causing shortages in raw materials. In March 2023, the United States banking crisis occurred with some bankruptcies and restructuring of American banks, however it was soon understood that it was a short-lived economic-financial phenomenon limited to the United States, although with some concern, it has not had an impact in the European area, with the exception of the collapse of Credit Suisse, in Switzerland. As a consequence, Italy is witnessing a tightening of its credit policies.

For Italian banks, there was an opportunity to strengthen themselves, thanks to the high rates imposed by the European Central Bank. The new BTP Valore bonds were released, which were very successful among the private operators to whom they were marketed due to the high interest rates. From October 7, 2023, geopolitical tensions are becoming more intense, related to the conflict in the Middle East. In 2024, however, the Italian economy continues to maintain its resilient strength, thanks to the reduction in energy prices, and the maintenance or reduction of oil prices, this stability allows a reduction in inflation. In September 2024, the European Central Bank has decreased interest rates by 0.25 percentage points. The Italian economy copes with a geopolitical scenario that was significantly deteriorating with the exacerbation of ongoing war conflicts. Strategic assets are better protected, in particular the defense sector. Furthermore, the implementation of the PNRR plan, which must be completed by 2026, has brought benefits to many economic sectors. According to Moody's, as of October 2025, Italy had achieved 54% of the Plan's objectives (compared to a European average of 38%), received 72% of the total funds and spent only 44% of those financial resources.

=== Longevity economy (2025–present) ===
The Italian economy could appear to be disadvantaged by demographic decline, However, new technologies, including artificial intelligence and robotics, could reduce this disadvantage and help companies grow and develop, as well as the public sector to be efficient, ensuring resilience. In this framework of economic transformation, between environmental sustainability and the application of artificial intelligence in industry, disadvantaged by the persistence and entrenchment of geopolitical conflicts and tensions, trade protectionism and de-globalization, Italian companies are more flexible and optimized to respond to the change in market demand.

The Italian economy, in addition to being resilient, is evolving into an economy of longevity.

On 23 May 2025, Moody's confirmed Italy's rating at Baa3 and improved the outlook from stable to positive. Public debt refinancing auctions were a success, with excellent demand among investors, with an ever-increasing percentage held by foreign investors. The work done by the Italian government in controlling public debt and the high savings and low debt of Italian families, combined with a strengthening of the Italian banking sector, which saw the cutting of their tax burden, are a guarantee for the future sustainability of the debt.

Even Southern Italy, historically characterized by few investment and low growth, is showing significant economic progress. On 10 October 2025, S&P confirmed Italy's rating at BBB+ with a stable outlook. However, these credit rating agencies' assessment of Italy's rating do not adequately take into account the continued appreciation of Italy's gold reserves, which, as of September 2025, still rank third in the world, providing further assurance for the solvency of Italian public debt. On 21 November 2025, Moody's upgraded Italy's rating from Baa3 to Baa2 with a stable outlook. On January 30, 2026, S&P confirmed Italy's rating at BBB+ with a positive outlook.

==== Economic impact of 2026 Iran war (2026–present) ====
At the beginning of 2026, the Italian economy continued to be resilient and growing, as it had been in 2025. However, escalating geopolitical tensions and conflicts in the Middle East led to the outbreak of the 2026 Iran War on 28 February 2026, involving all Persian Gulf countries and West Asia. The regional war pitting Israel and the United States on one side against the Iranian theocracy regime on the other had global consequences, particularly on the price of crude oil and gas and the availability of oil and fertilizers. However, Italy implemented effective countermeasures, increasing its share of gas imports from Algeria to replace that from Qatar, where plants were damaged by the Iranian attacks. It also introduced greater price protections for electricity and gas and measures to contain the price of gasoline and diesel. Among the consequences of the ongoing war for the Italian economy by 2026, an estimated loss of exports to the Persian Gulf countries of approximately €20 billion is expected, with a consequent reduction in GDP and increased inflation that could be a consequence of rising energy costs, which might not occur if the conflict were resolved within a few weeks. However, the Italian economy has proven extremely resilient to potential shocks. Italy has implemented measures to increase production from renewable energy and to begin the construction of nuclear fusion reactors to avoid future energy shocks and crises.

=== Gold ===
The majority of Italy's gold reserves, amounting to a total of 2,451.8 tons, are held by the Bank of Italy on behalf of the Italy. This reserve consists almost entirely of bullion and a small portion of coins. Of this reserve, 44% is held in Italy, 43% in the United States, 5.76% in the United Kingdom, and 6.09% in Switzerland. At current market values in December 2025, it is worth 274 billion euros. The recent Italian budget law for 2026 aims to reaffirm that this asset guarantee the solvency of Italy's public debt. Moreover, Italy, in addition to its strong specialization in luxury goods and fashion, is also a major player in Jewellery, where gold is used as a processing material. The gold reserves held by the so-called goldsmiths districts are quite considerable.

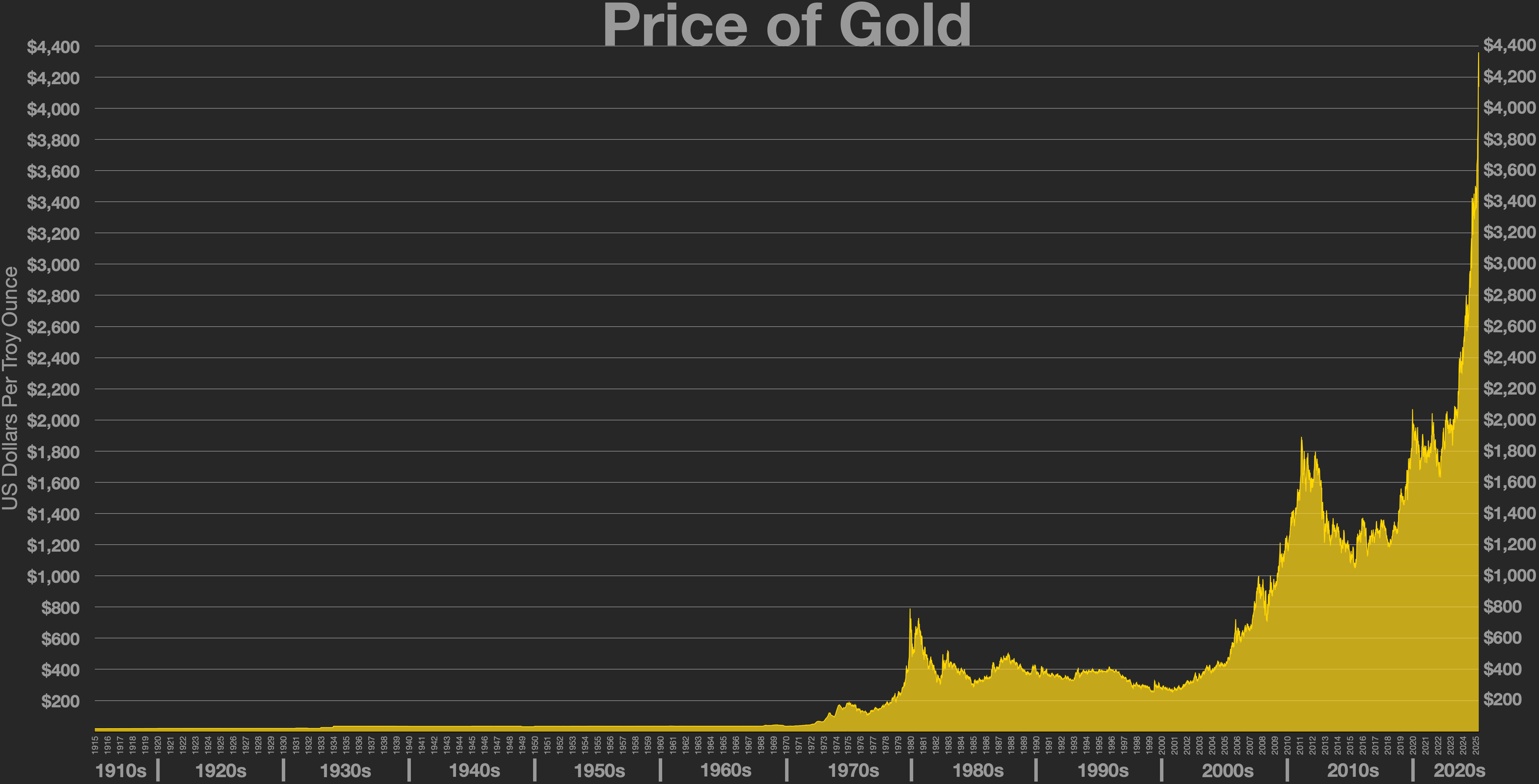
The chart examines the price of gold from 1915 to 2025. Note the impressive increase in the price of gold in the years following the COVID-19 pandemic, with growing geopolitical tensions.

On 22 December 2025, gold surpasses the price of $4,400 an ounce. Furthermore, on 12 January 2026, gold again surpassed its record price, settling at $4,600 an ounce. On 28 January 2026, gold reaches a new record high of over $5,200 an ounce. But on 29 January 2026, gold surpasses its all-time high of nearly $5,600 an ounce.

=== Currency ===
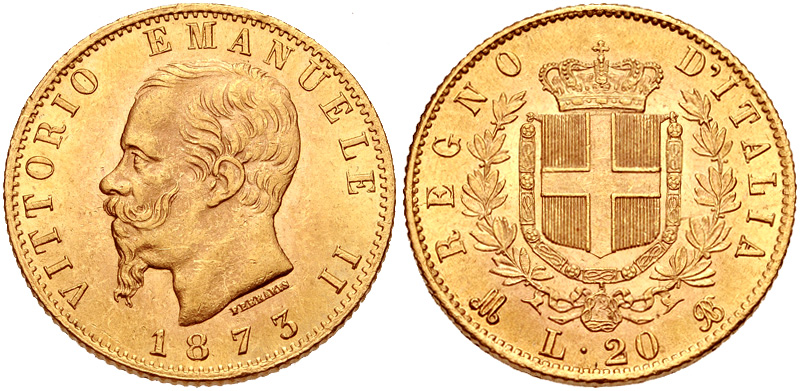
Gold 20 lire coin, 1873

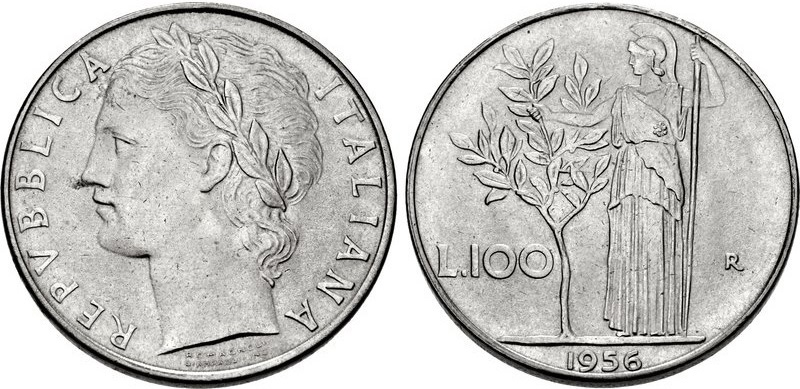
100 lire coin, 1956, with goddess Minerva holding an olive tree and a long spear depicted on the reverse

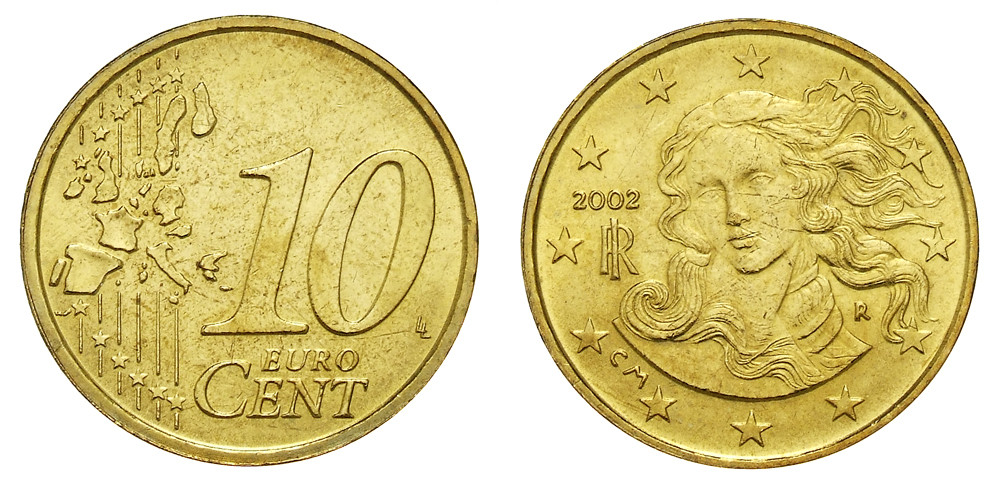
Italian 10 euro cent coin, with The Birth of Venus by Sandro Botticelli depicted on the reverse

Italy has a long history of different coinage types, which spans thousands of years. Italy has been influential at a coinage point of view: the medieval Florentine florin, one of the most used coinage types in European history and one of the most important coins in Western history, was struck in Florence in the 13th century, while the Venetian sequin, minted from 1284 to 1797, was the most prestigious gold coin in circulation in the commercial centers of the Mediterranean Sea.

Despite the fact that the first Italian coinage systems were used in the Magna Graecia and Etruscan civilization, the Romans introduced a widespread currency throughout Italy. Unlike most modern coins, Roman coins had intrinsic value. The early modern Italian coins were very similar in style to French francs, especially in decimals, since it was ruled by the country in the Napoleonic Kingdom of Italy. They corresponded to a value of 0.29 grams of gold or 4.5 grams of silver.

Since Italy has been for centuries divided into many historic states, they all had different coinage systems, but when the country became unified in 1861, the Italian lira came into place, and was used until 2002. The term originates from libra, the largest unit of the Carolingian monetary system used in Western Europe and elsewhere from the 8th to the 20th century. In 1999, the euro became Italy's unit of account and the lira became a national subunit of the euro at a rate of 1 euro = 1,936.27 lire, before being replaced as cash in 2002.

== Overview ==
=== Data ===
The following table shows the main economic indicators in 1980–2023 (with IMF staff estimates in 2024–2029). Inflation below 5% is in green.

| Year | GDP (in Bil. US$PPP) | GDP per capita (in US$ PPP) | GDP (in Bil. US$nominal) | GDP per capita (in US$ nominal) | GDP growth (real) | Inflation rate (in Percent) | Unemployment (in Percent) | Government debt (in % of GDP) |
|---|---|---|---|---|---|---|---|---|
| 1980 | 614.4 | 10,895.8 | 482.7 | 8,559.5 | ▲3.1% | ▲21.8% | 7.4% | n/a |
| 1981 | ▲676.3 | ▲11,973.7 | ▼437.7 | ▼7,749.8 | ▲0.6% | ▲19.5% | ▲7.6% | n/a |
| 1982 | ▲719.2 | ▲12,723.3 | ▼432.6 | ▼7,652.9 | ▲0.2% | ▲16.5% | ▲8.3% | n/a |
| 1983 | ▲754.2 | ▲13,334.6 | ▲448.9 | ▲7,936.2 | ▲0.9% | ▲14.7% | ▼7.4% | n/a |
| 1984 | ▲805.0 | ▲14,231.6 | ▼443.5 | ▼7,840.8 | ▲3.0% | ▲10.7% | ▲7.8% | n/a |
| 1985 | ▲852.2 | ▲15,060.2 | ▲458.0 | ▲8,093.6 | ▲2.6% | ▲9.0% | ▲8.2% | n/a |
| 1986 | ▲893.0 | ▲15,777.1 | ▲648.7 | ▲11,461.2 | ▲2.7% | ▲5.8% | ▲8.9% | n/a |
| 1987 | ▲943.1 | ▲16,664.2 | ▲814.2 | ▲14,385.8 | ▲3.1% | ▲4.7% | ▲9.6% | n/a |
| 1988 | ▲1,015.7 | ▲17,942.2 | ▲902.0 | ▲15,934.2 | ▲4.0% | ▲5.1% | ▲9.7% | 95.2% |
| 1989 | ▲1,089.9 | ▲19,238.7 | ▲938.1 | ▲16,560.6 | ▲3.3% | ▲6.2% | 9.7% | ▲97.9% |
| 1990 | ▲1,153.1 | ▲20,338.1 | ▲1,170.8 | ▲20,651.8 | ▲2.0% | ▲6.4% | ▼8.9% | ▲101.1% |
| 1991 | ▲1,209.2 | ▲21,309.8 | ▲1,236.8 | ▲21,795.7 | ▲1.4% | ▲6.2% | ▼8.5% | ▲104.7% |
| 1992 | ▲1,245.7 | ▲21,941.9 | ▲1,312.4 | ▲23,116.6 | ▲0.7% | ▲5.0% | ▲8.8% | ▲112.3% |
| 1993 | ▲1,264.6 | ▲22,255.4 | ▼1,055.3 | ▼18,572.9 | ▼-0.8% | ▲4.5% | ▲9.8% | ▲123.4% |
| 1994 | ▲1,318.4 | ▲23,193.6 | ▲1,088.5 | ▲19,149.5 | ▲2.1% | ▲4.2% | ▲10.6% | ▲130.1% |
| 1995 | ▲1,382.1 | ▲24,314.4 | ▲1,175.3 | ▲20,675.3 | ▲2.7% | ▲5.4% | ▲11.2% | ▼119.4% |
| 1996 | ▲1,425.3 | ▲25,073.3 | ▲1,312.8 | ▲23,094.4 | ▲1.3% | ▲4.0% | 11.2% | ▼119.1% |
| 1997 | ▲1,476.4 | ▲25,957.8 | ▼1,243.2 | ▼21,858.5 | ▲1.8% | ▲1.8% | 11.2% | ▼116.8% |
| 1998 | ▲1,520.0 | ▲26,712.1 | ▲1,271.7 | ▲22,348.1 | ▲1.8% | ▲2.0% | ▲11.3% | ▼114.1% |
| 1999 | ▲1,566.5 | ▲27,526.6 | ▼1,253.7 | ▼22,029.7 | ▲1.6% | ▲1.7% | ▼10.9% | ▼113.3% |
| 2000 | ▲1,662.7 | ▲29,208.9 | ▼1,147.2 | ▼20,153.1 | ▲3.8% | ▲2.6% | ▼10.1% | ▼109.0% |
| 2001 | ▲1,733.3 | ▲30,429.9 | ▲1,168.0 | ▲20,505.9 | ▲2.0% | ▲2.3% | ▼9.1% | ▼108.9% |
| 2002 | ▲1,764.8 | ▲30,964.9 | ▲1,275.9 | ▲22,386.3 | ▲0.3% | ▲2.6% | ▼8.6% | ▼106.4% |
| 2003 | ▲1,802.1 | ▲31,513.1 | ▲1,577.2 | ▲27,580.5 | ▲0.1% | ▲2.8% | ▼8.5% | ▼105.5% |
| 2004 | ▲1,876.8 | ▲32,577.2 | ▲1,805.7 | ▲31,342.8 | ▲1.4% | ▲2.3% | ▼8.0% | ▼105.1% |
| 2005 | ▲1,951.5 | ▲33,621.3 | ▲1,859.2 | ▲32,031.4 | ▲0.8% | ▲2.2% | ▼7.8% | ▲106.6% |
| 2006 | ▲2,047.8 | ▲35,131.2 | ▲1,949.7 | ▲33,448.1 | ▲1.8% | ▲2.2% | ▼6.9% | ▲106.7% |
| 2007 | ▲2,134.4 | ▲36,478.4 | ▲2,213.4 | ▲37,828.3 | ▲1.5% | ▲2.0% | ▼6.2% | ▼103.9% |
| 2008 | ▲2,154.4 | ▲36,513.9 | ▲2,408.4 | ▲40,819.0 | ▼-1.0% | ▲3.5% | ▲6.8% | ▲106.2% |
| 2009 | ▼2,053.7 | ▼34,561.9 | ▼2,197.5 | ▼36,982.8 | ▼-5.3% | ▲0.8% | ▲7.9% | ▲116.6% |
| 2010 | ▲2,114.0 | ▲35,415.9 | ▼2,137.8 | ▼35,815.6 | ▲1.7% | ▲1.6% | ▲8.5% | ▲119.2% |
| 2011 | ▲2,173.2 | ▲36,250.6 | ▲2,294.6 | ▲38,276.0 | ▲0.7% | ▲2.9% | ▲8.6% | ▲119.7% |
| 2012 | ▼2,172.4 | ▼36,143.0 | ▼2,088.3 | ▼34,743.8 | ▼-3.0% | ▲3.3% | ▲10.9% | ▲126.5% |
| 2013 | ▲2,187.4 | ▲36,288.5 | ▲2,142.0 | ▲35,535.0 | ▼-1.8% | ▲1.2% | ▲12.4% | ▲132.5% |
| 2014 | ▲2,200.3 | ▲36,460.7 | ▲2,162.6 | ▲35,836.2 | ▼0.0% | ▲0.2% | ▲12.8% | ▲135.4% |
| 2015 | ▲2,241.5 | ▲37,175.6 | ▼1,836.8 | ▼30,463.7 | ▲0.8% | ▲0.1% | ▼12.0% | ▼135.3% |
| 2016 | ▲2,420.4 | ▲40,230.7 | ▲1,876.6 | ▲31,190.8 | ▲1.3% | ▲-0.1% | ▼11.7% | ▼134.8% |
| 2017 | ▲2,529.5 | ▲42,111.5 | ▲1,961.1 | ▲32,648.8 | ▲1.7% | ▲1.3% | ▼11.3% | ▼134.2% |
| 2018 | ▲2,613.9 | ▲43,610.3 | ▲2,092.9 | ▲34,917.6 | ▲0.9% | ▲1.2% | ▼10.6% | ▲134.4% |
| 2019 | ▲2,674.0 | ▲44,702.9 | ▼2,011.5 | ▼33,627.9 | ▲0.5% | ▲0.6% | ▼9.9% | ▼134.1% |
| 2020 | ▼2,461.9 | ▼41,279.1 | ▼1,891.1 | ▼31,707.1 | ▼-9.0% | ▲-0.1% | ▼9.3% | ▲155.3% |
| 2021 | ▲2,734.6 | ▲46,164.6 | ▲2,101.3 | ▲35,472.8 | ▲8.3% | ▲1.9% | ▲9.5% | ▼150.9% |
| 2022 | ▲3,345.9 | ▲56,682.0 | ▲2,104.6 | ▲35,653.8 | ▲4.0% | ▲8.7% | ▼8.1% | ▼138.1% |
| 2023 | ▲3,490.5 | ▲59,164.5 | ▲2,301.6 | ▲39,012.0 | ▲0.9% | ▲5.9% | ▼7.6% | ▼134.5% |
| 2024 | ▲3,597.9 | ▲60,992.8 | ▲2,376.5 | ▲40,286.8 | ▲0.7% | ▲1.2% | ▼7.0% | ▲136.8% |
| 2025 | ▲3,691.2 | ▲62,603.0 | ▲2,459.5 | ▲41,714.4 | ▲0.8% | ▲2.1% | ▲7.1% | ▲138.6% |
| 2026 | ▲3,786.0 | ▲64,262.3 | ▲2,534.5 | ▲43,020.0 | ▲0.7% | ▲2.0% | ▲7.3% | ▲140.1% |
| 2027 | ▲3,878.5 | ▲65,905.6 | ▲2,595.7 | ▲44,108.3 | ▲0.6% | ▲2.0% | ▲7.4% | ▲141.3% |
| 2028 | ▲3,976.4 | ▲67,663.9 | ▲2,663.6 | ▲45,325.3 | ▲0.7% | ▲2.0% | ▲7.5% | ▲141.9% |
| 2029 | ▲4,078.0 | ▲69,507.6 | ▲2,736.1 | ▲46,635.8 | ▲0.7% | ▲2.0% | ▲7.6% | ▲142.3% |

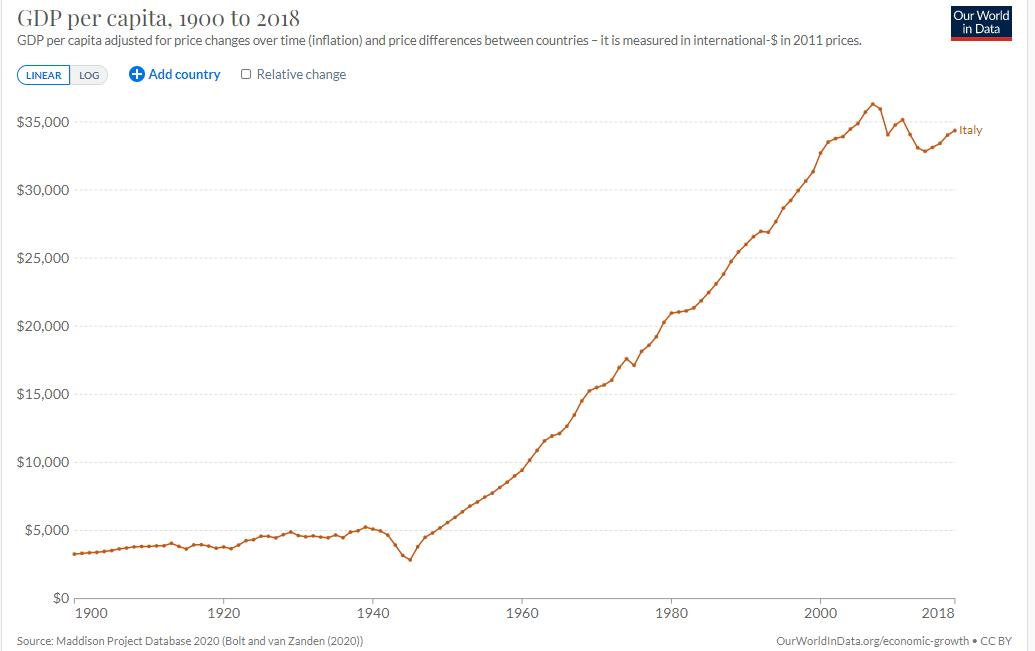
Development of real GDP per capita, 1900 to 2018

=== Companies ===
==== Italian companies on 2024 Fortune Global 500 list ====
This list displays all five Italian companies on the Fortune Global 500 list, which ranks the world's largest companies by annual revenue. The figures below are given in millions of US dollars and are for the fiscal year 2018. Also listed are the headquarters location, net profit and industry sector of each company.

| Rank | Fortune 500 rank | Name | Industry | Revenue (USD millions) | Profits (USD millions) | Employees | Headquarters |
|---|---|---|---|---|---|---|---|
| 1 | 98 | Enel | Electric utility | 103,311 | 3,717 | 61,055 | Rome |
| 2 | 97 | Eni | Oil and gas | 102,502 | 5,158 | 33,142 | Rome |
| 3 | 245 | Assicurazioni Generali | Insurance | 57,023 | 4,051 | 81,879 | Trieste |
| 4 | 283 | Intesa Sanpaolo | Finance | 52,004 | 8,351 | 94,368 | Turin |
| 5 | 314 | UniCredit | Banking | 48,044 | 10,278 | 70,752 | Milan |

In 2022, the sector with the highest number of companies registered in Italy is Services with 654,065 companies followed by Retail Trade and Finance, Insurance, and Real Estate with 519,448 and 348,881 companies respectively.

=== Wealth ===
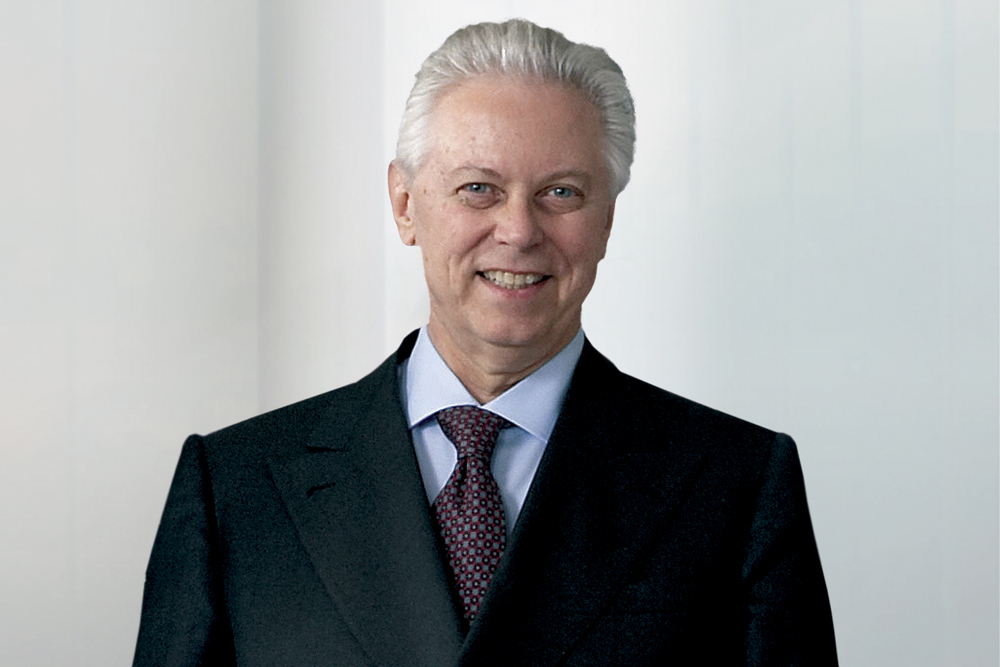
Stefano Pessina

Italy has 1.3 million people with a net wealth greater than $1 million, a total national wealth of $11.020 trillion, and represents the 9th largest cumulative net wealth globally (it accounts for 2.4% of the net wealth in the world). According to the UBS's Global Wealth Databook 2024, the median wealth per adult is $113,754 (14th in the world), while according to the Allianz's Global Wealth Report 2024, the net financial wealth per capita is €76,930 (14th in the world).

The following top 10 list of Italian billionaires is based on an annual assessment of wealth and assets compiled and published by Forbes in 2017.

| Rank (World) | Rank (Italy) | Name | Net worth ($bn) | Main source | Main sector |
|---|---|---|---|---|---|
| 29 | 1 | Maria Franca Fissolo Ferrero & family | 25.2 | Ferrero SpA | Food |
| 50 | 2 | Leonardo Del Vecchio | 17.9 | Luxottica | Eyewear |
| 80 | 3 | Stefano Pessina | 13.9 | Walgreens Boots | Pharmaceutical retail |
| 133 | 4 | Massimiliana Landini Aleotti | 9.5 | Menarini | Pharmaceutical |
| 199 | 5 | Silvio Berlusconi | 7.0 | Fininvest | Financial services |
| 215 | 6 | Giorgio Armani | 6.6 | Armani | Fashion |
| 250 | 7 | Augusto & Giorgio Perfetti | 5.8 | Perfetti Van Melle | Confectionery |
| 385 | 8 | Paolo & Gianfelice Rocca | 3.4 | Techint | Conglomerate |
| 474 | 9 | Giuseppe De'Longhi | 3.8 | De'Longhi | Small appliance |
| 603 | 10 | Patrizio Bertelli | 3.3 | Prada | Apparels |

=== Regional data ===
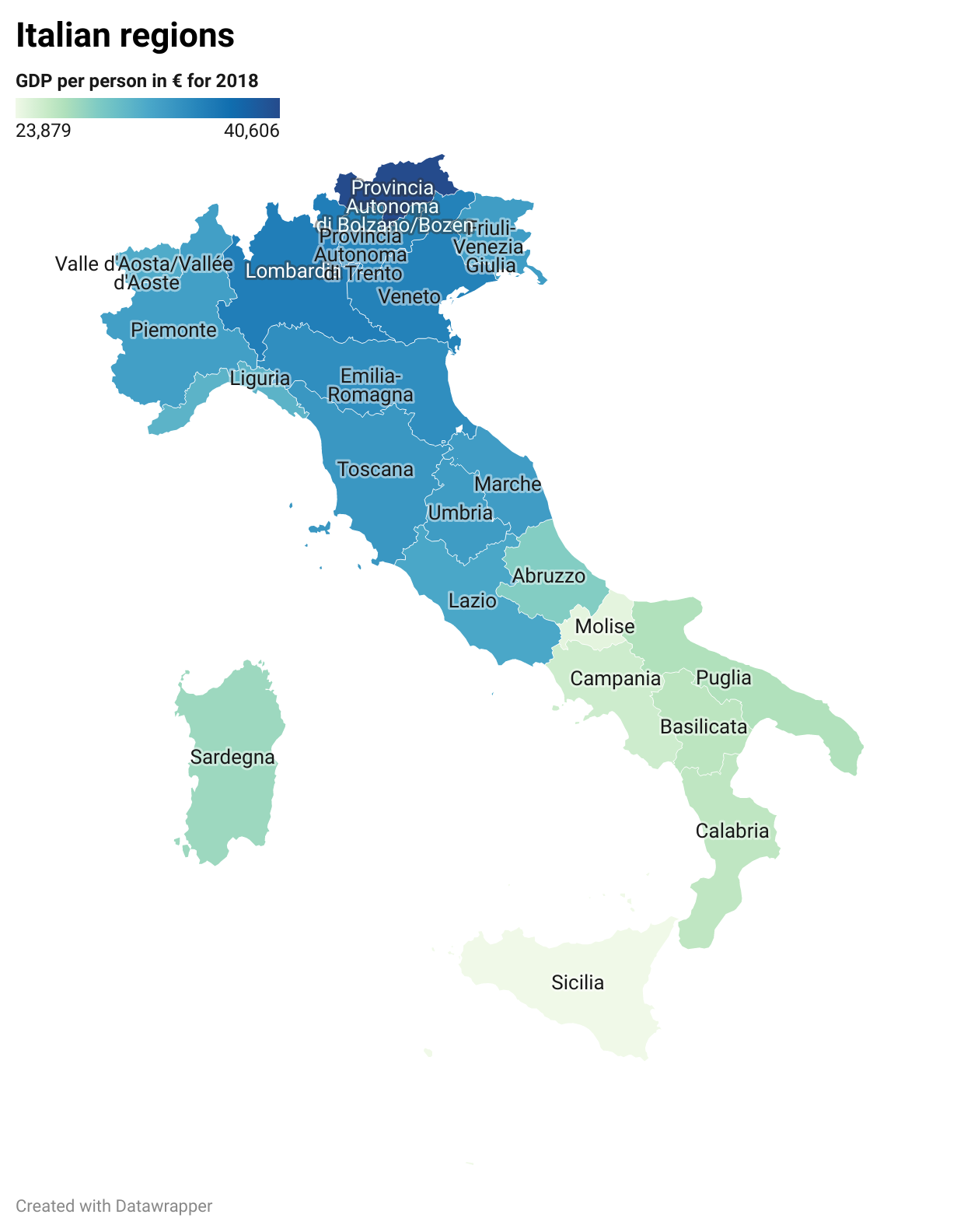
Map of Italian regions by GDP per capita in 2018

2024-2025 gross domestic product in Italy
| Rank | Region | 2024 GDP €m | 2022 GDP €m | % of Nation | € per capita (2024) |
|---|---|---|---|---|---|
| – | Italy | ▲2,199,619.4 | 1,946,479 | 100.00 | 37,308 |
| 1 | Lombardy | ▲504,729.96 | 439,986.38 | 22.94 | 50,398 |
| 2 | Lazio | ▲246,486.53 | 212,911.42 | 11.20 | 43,166 |
| 3 | Veneto | ▲201,245.73 | 180,173.48 | 9.14 | 41,496 |
| 4 | Emilia-Romagna | ▲198,395.23 | 176,844.9 | 9.01 | 44,557 |
| 5 | Piedmont | ▲164,165.06 | 145,913.79 | 7.46 | 38,625 |
| 6 | Tuscany | ▲143,563.3 | 128,308.37 | 6.52 | 39,262 |
| 7 | Campania | ▲137,510.98 | 119,467.68 | 6.25 | 24,564 |
| 8 | Sicily | ▲112,029.68 | 97,124.1 | 5.09 | 23,308 |
| 9 | Apulia | ▲94,507.89 | 85,960.7 | 4.29 | 24,327 |
| 10 | Liguria | ▲58,958.93 | 53,854.51 | 2.68 | 38,841 |
| 11 | Marche | ▲50,509.69 | 45,859.37 | 2.29 | 34,149 |
| 12 | Friuli-Venezia Giulia | ▲46,601.88 | 43,048.67 | 2.11 | 39,005 |
| 13 | Sardinia | ▲43,467.53 | 37,978.08 | 1.97 | 27,730 |
| 14 | Abruzzo | ▲40,760.57 | 34,572.45 | 1.85 | 32,108 |
| 15 | Calabria | ▲40,003.45 | 36,081.42 | 1.81 | 21,702 |
| 16 | South Tyrol | ▲33,079.54 | 29,106.27 | 1.50 | 61,601 |
| 17 | Umbria | ▲27,673.58 | 24,264.04 | 1.25 | 32,466 |
| 18 | Trentino | ▲26,055.72 | 24,002.76 | 1.18 | 47,764 |
| 19 | Basilicata | ▲15,083.47 | 13,966.85 | 0.68 | 28,416 |
| 20 | Molise | ▲7,986.7 | 7,219.42 | 0.36 | 27,697 |
| 21 | Aosta Valley | ▲5,852.16 | 5,404.03 | 0.26 | 47,742 |

=== Southern question ===
Normalized index of industrialization of the Italian provinces in 1871 (the national average is 1.0). Source: Bank of Italy. Over 1.4 From 1.1 to 1.4 From 0.9 to 1.1 Up to 0.9

Map of the Italian diaspora in the world

In the decades following the unification of Italy, the northern regions of the country, Lombardy, Piedmont and Liguria in particular, began a process of industrialization and economic development while the southern regions remained behind. At the time of the unification of the country, there was a shortage of entrepreneurs in the south, with landowners who were often absent from their farms as they lived permanently in the city, leaving the management of their funds to managers, who were not encouraged by the owners to make the agricultural estates to the maximum. Landowners invested not in agricultural equipment, but in such things as low-risk state bonds.

In southern Italy, the unification of the country broke down the feudal land system, which had survived in the south since the Middle Ages, especially where land had been the inalienable property of aristocrats, religious bodies or the king. The breakdown of feudalism, however, and redistribution of land did not necessarily lead to small farmers in the south winding up with land of their own or land they could work and make profit from. Many remained landless, and plots grew smaller and smaller and so less and less productive, as land was subdivided amongst heirs.

This gap between northern and southern Italy, called "southern question", was also induced by the region-specific policies selected by the post-unitary governments. For example, the 1887 protectionist reform, instead of safeguarding the arboriculture sectors crushed by 1880s fall in prices, shielded the Po Valley wheat breeding and those Northern textile and manufacturing industries that had survived the liberal years due to state intervention. A similar logic guided the assignment of monopoly rights in the steamboat construction and navigation sectors and, above all, the public spending in the railway sector, which represented 53% of the 1861–1911 total.

The resources necessary to finance the public spending effort were obtained through highly unbalanced land property taxes, which affected the key source of savings available for investment in the growth sectors absent a developed banking system. Given the inability of the government to estimate the land profitability, especially because of the huge differences among the regional cadasters, this policy irreparably induced large regional discrepancies. This policy destroyed the relationship between the central state and the Southern population by unchaining first a civil war called Brigandage, which brought about 20,000 victims by 1864 and the militarization of the area, and then favouring emigration, especially from 1892 to 1921.

After the rise of Benito Mussolini, the "Iron Prefect" Cesare Mori tried to defeat the already powerful criminal organizations flourishing in the South with some degree of success. Fascist policy aimed at the creation of an Italian Empire and Southern Italian ports were strategic for all commerce towards the colonies. With the invasion of Southern Italy during World War II, the Allies restored the authority of the mafia families, lost during the Fascist period, and used their influence to maintain public order.

In the 1950s the Cassa per il Mezzogiorno was set up as a huge public master plan to help industrialize the South, aiming to do this in two ways: through land reforms creating 120,000 new smallholdings, and through the "Growth Pole Strategy" whereby 60% of all government investment would go to the South, thus boosting the Southern economy by attracting new capital, stimulating local firms, and providing employment. However, the objectives were largely missed, and as a result, the South became increasingly subsidized and state-dependent, incapable of generating private growth itself.

The imbalance between North and South was reduced in the 1960s and 1970s through the construction of public works, the implementation of agrarian and scholastic reforms, the expansion of industrialization and the improved living conditions of the population. This convergence process was interrupted, however, in the 1980s. To date, the per capita GDP of the South is just 58% of that of the Center-North, but this gap is mitigated by the fact that there the cost of living is around 10-15% lower on average (with even more differences between small towns and big cities) than that in the North of Italy. In the South the unemployment rate is more than double (6.7% in the North against 14.9% in the South). A study by Censis blames the pervasive presence of criminal organizations for the delay of Southern Italy, estimating an annual loss of wealth of 2.5% in the South in the period between 1981 and 2003 due to their presence, and that without them the per capita GDP of the South would have reached that of the North.

== Economic sectors ==
=== Primary ===
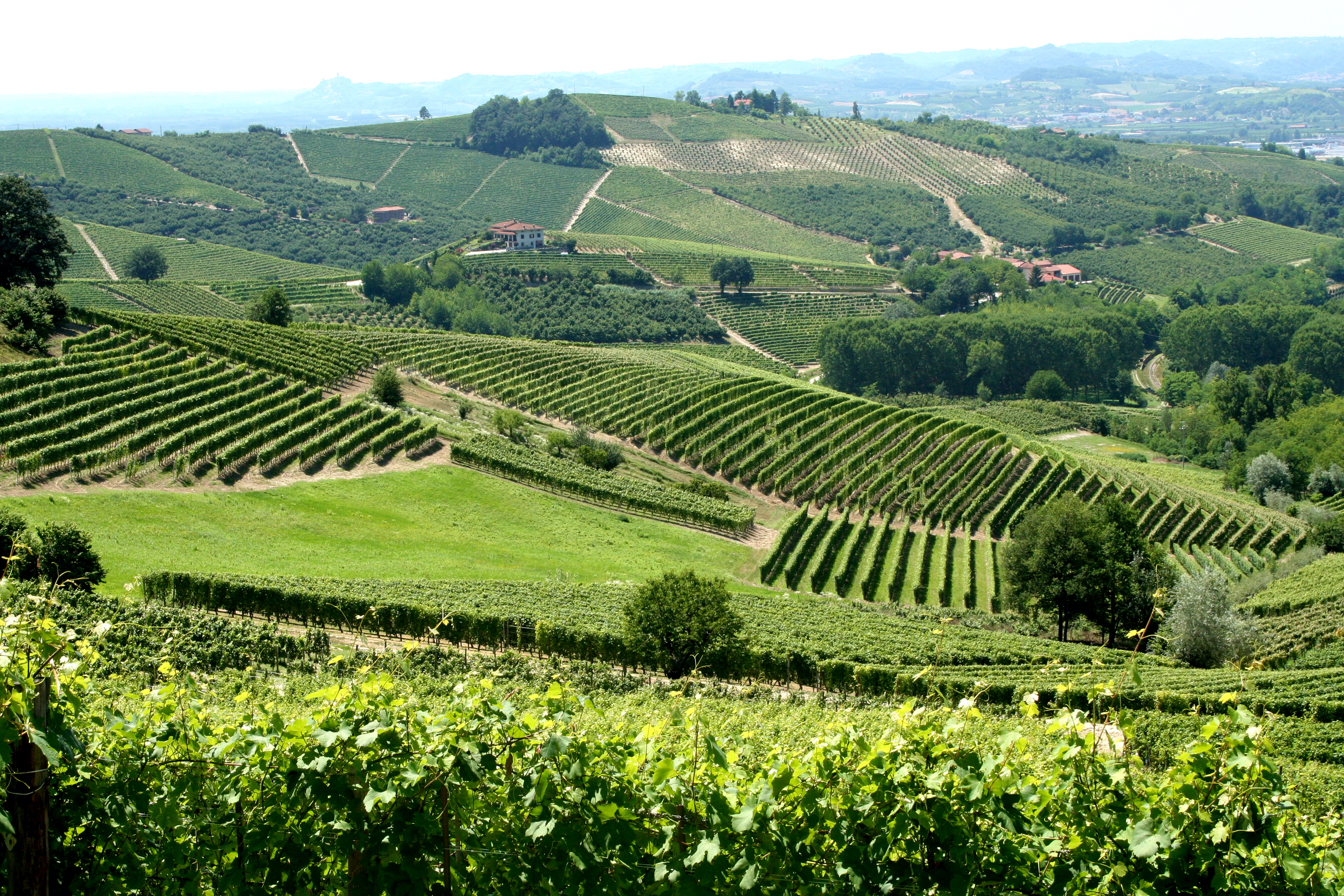
Vineyards in Langhe and Montferrat, Piedmont. Italy is the world's largest wine producer (22% of the global market), as well as the country with the widest variety of indigenous grapevine in the world.

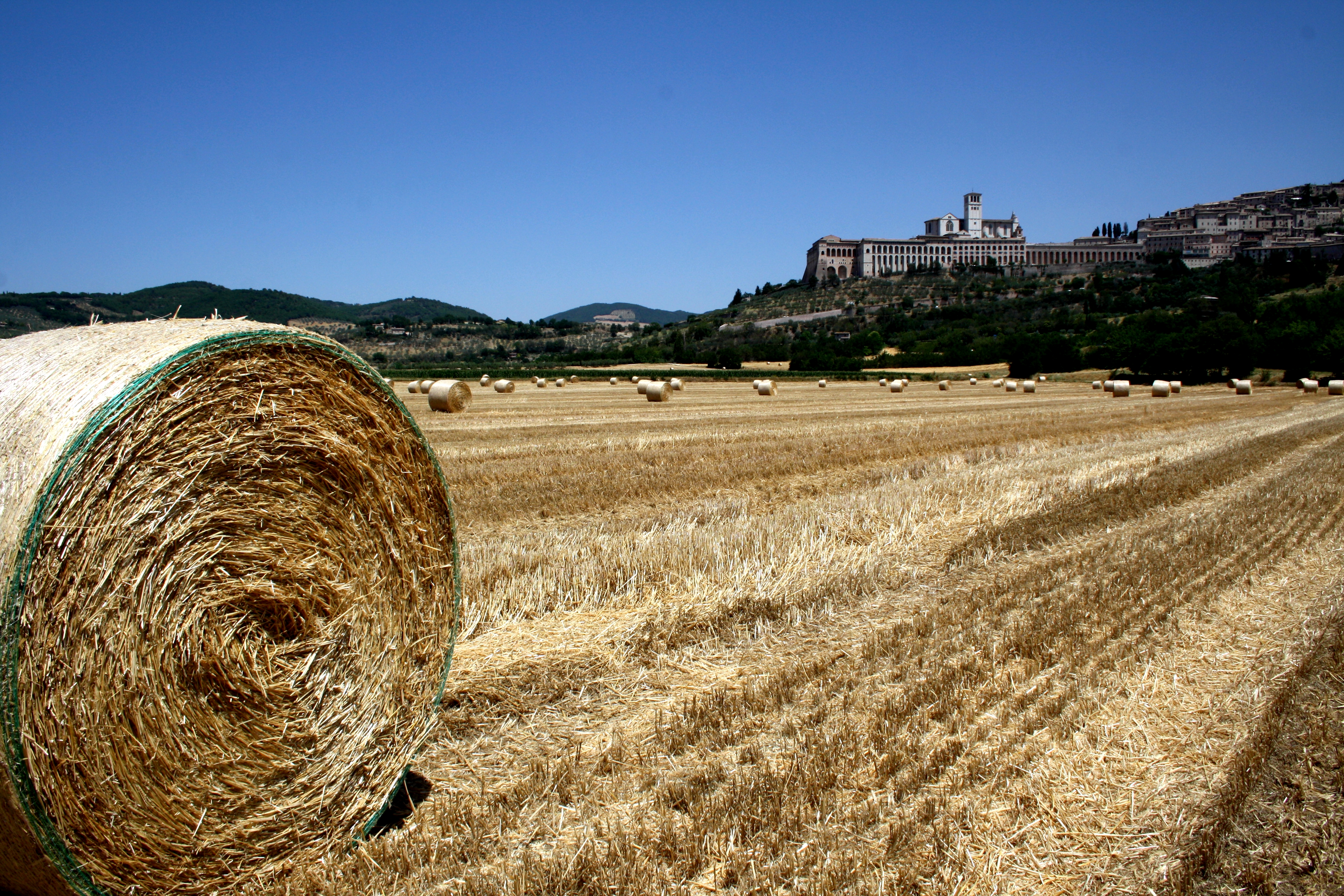
Cultivated field in Umbria. The Basilica of Saint Francis of Assisi is in the background.

According to the last national agricultural census, there were 1.6 million farms in 2010 (−32.4% since 2000) covering 12,700,000 ha or 31,382,383 acres (63% of which are located in Southern Italy). The vast majority (99%) are family-operated and small, averaging only 8 ha (20 acres) in size. Of the total surface area in agricultural use (forestry excluded), grain fields take up 31%, olive tree orchards 8.2%, vineyards 5.4%, citrus orchards 3.8%, sugar beets 1.7%, and horticulture 2.4%. The remainder is primarily dedicated to pastures (25.9%) and feed grains (11.6%). The northern part of Italy produces primarily maize corn, rice, sugar beets, soybeans, meat, fruits and dairy products, while the South specializes in wheat, olive and citrus fruits. Livestock includes 6 million head of cattle, 8.6 million head of swine, 6.8 million head of sheep, and 0.9 million head of goats. The total annual production of the fishing industry in Italy from capture and aquaculture, including crustaceans and molluscs, is around 480,000 tons.

Italy is the largest producer of wine in the world, and one of the leading producers of olive oil, fruits (apples, olives, grapes, oranges, lemons, pears, apricots, hazelnuts, peaches, cherries, plums, strawberries, and kiwifruits), and vegetables (especially artichokes and tomatoes). The most famous Italian wines are the Tuscan Chianti and the Piedmontese Barolo. Other famous wines are Barbaresco, Barbera d'Asti, Brunello di Montalcino, Frascati, Montepulciano d'Abruzzo, Morellino di Scansano, Amarone della Valpolicella DOCG and the sparkling wines Franciacorta and Prosecco. Quality goods in which Italy specialises, particularly the already mentioned wines and regional cheeses, are often protected under the quality assurance labels DOC/DOP. This geographical indication certificate, which is attributed by the European Union, is considered important to avoid confusion with low-quality mass-produced ersatz products.

In fact, Italian cuisine is one of the most popular and copied around the world. The lack or total unavailability of some of its most characteristic ingredients outside of Italy, also and above all to falsifications (or food fraud), leads to the complete denaturalization of Italian ingredients. This phenomenon, widespread in all continents, is better known as Italian Sounding, consisting in the use of words as well as images, colour combinations (the Italian tricolour), geographical references, brands evocative of Italy to promote and market agri-food products which in reality have nothing to do with Italian cuisine.

=== Secondary ===
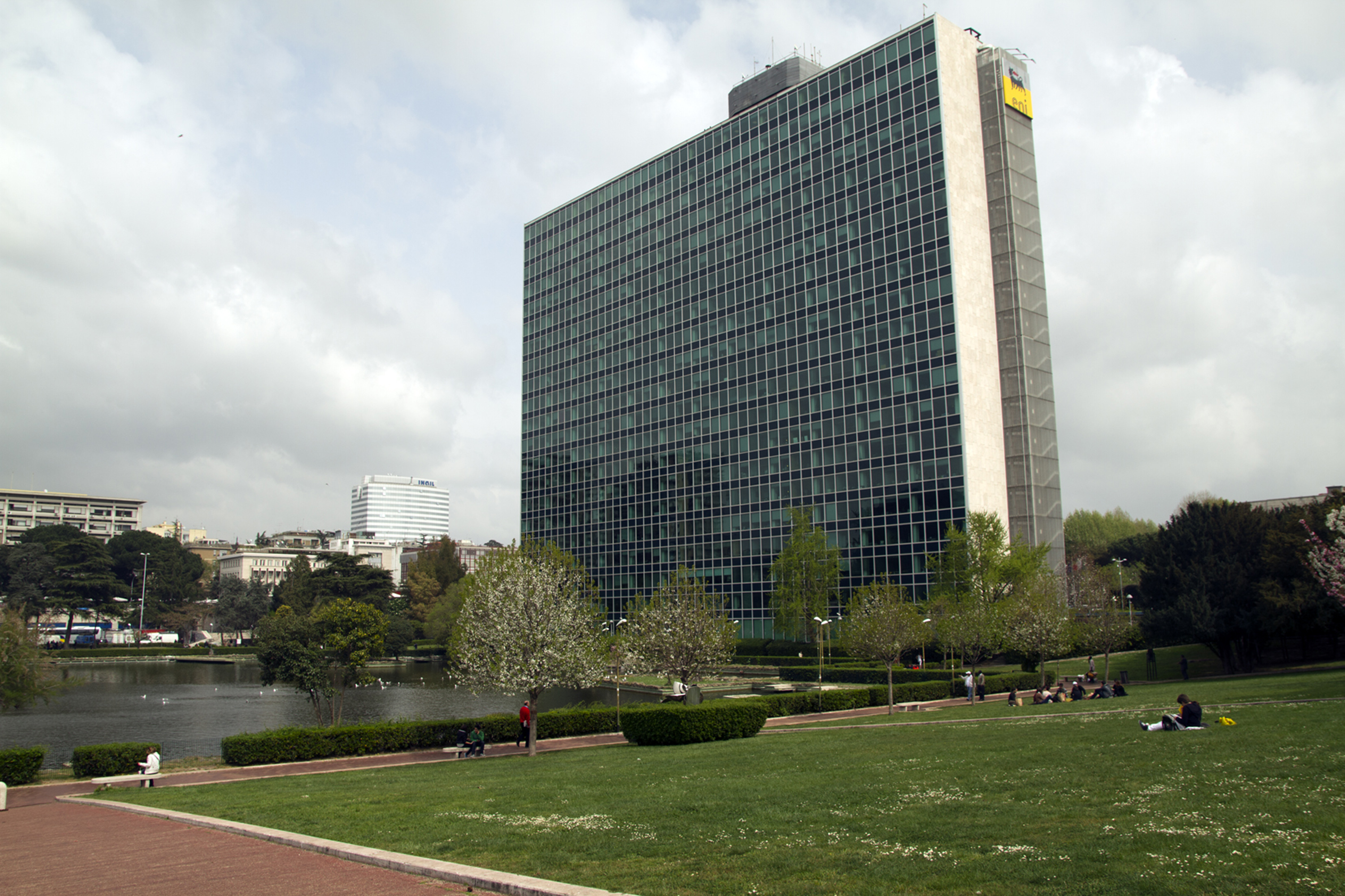
Eni is considered one of the world's oil and gas "Supermajors"

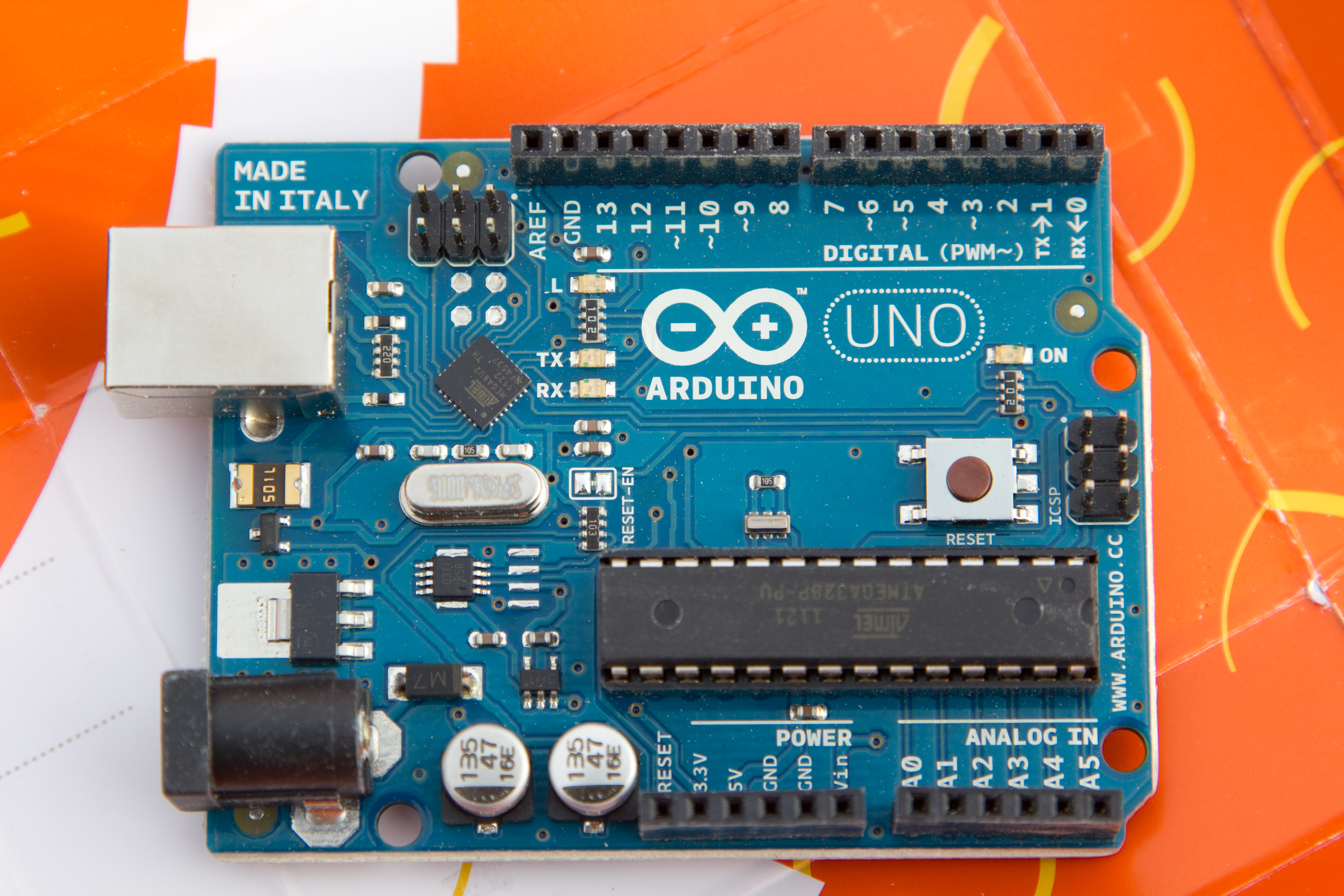
Arduino Uno, a MCU board made in Italy, has gained popularity worldwide.

Italy is the world's sixth-largest manufacturing country. Italy has a smaller number of global multinational corporations than other economies of comparable size, but it has a large number of small and medium-sized enterprises, many of them grouped in clusters, which are the backbone of the Italian industry. This results in a manufacturing sector often focused on the export of niche market and luxury products, that is less capable of competing on quantity but is more capable of facing the competition of emerging economies based on lower labour costs, given the higher quality of its products.

The industrial districts are regionalized: in the Northwest, there is a large modern group of industries, as in the so-called "industrial triangle" (Milan-Turin-Genoa), where there is an area of intense machinery, automotive, aerospace production and shipbuilding; in the Northeast, an area that experienced social and economic development mostly around family-based firms, there are mostly small and medium enterprises of lower technology but high craftsmanship, specializing in machinery, clothing, leather products, footwear, furniture, textiles, machine tools, spare parts, home appliances, and jewellery. In central Italy, there are mostly small and medium-sized companies specializing in products such as textiles, leather, jewellery but also machinery. According to a study carried out in 2015 by the Edison Foundation and Confindustria on the most industrialized provinces in Europe, of the five most industrialized provinces in Europe, three are Italian provinces. Brescia turns out to be the first European province for value added by industry, with an added value over 10 billion euros.

The automotive industry in Italy is a significant part of the manufacturing sector, with over 144,000 firms and almost 485,000 employed people in 2015, and a contribution of 8.5% to Italian GDP. Italy's automotive industry is best known for its automobile designs and small city cars, sports and supercars. Italy is one of the significant automobile producers both in Europe and around the world. Today the Italian automotive industry is almost totally dominated by Fiat Group (now included in Stellantis corporation). As well as its own, predominantly mass market model range, Stellantis owns the mainstream Fiat brand, the upmarket Alfa Romeo and Lancia brands, and the exotic Maserati brand. Luxury cars such as Ferrari, Lamborghini, Maserati and Ducati motorcycles are also made in the Northeast region of Emilia-Romagna. Italian cars have won the annual European Car of the Year award several times (with Fiat winning more than any other manufacturer), and have also been awarded the World Car of the Year award.

According to ISTAT, the industrial production index, perhaps with some leading sectors, recorded 32 out of 36 months of decline from 2022 to May 2025, losing 2% in 2023 and 4% in 2024 (to which 0.4% is added from 2025 to February 2026). From 2008 to 2023, more than 3,000 Italian companies – of which more than 1,000 since 2021 and a further 429 in 2024 – sold their ownership to foreign investors for a value of more than 200 billion euros. Between December 2011 and December 2024, the stock of bank loans to Italian private companies fell by 31% (from 929 to 641 billion euros), while in France it grew by 70% (from 880 to 1,491 billion) and in Germany by 53% (from 910 to 1,391 billion).

=== Tertiary ===
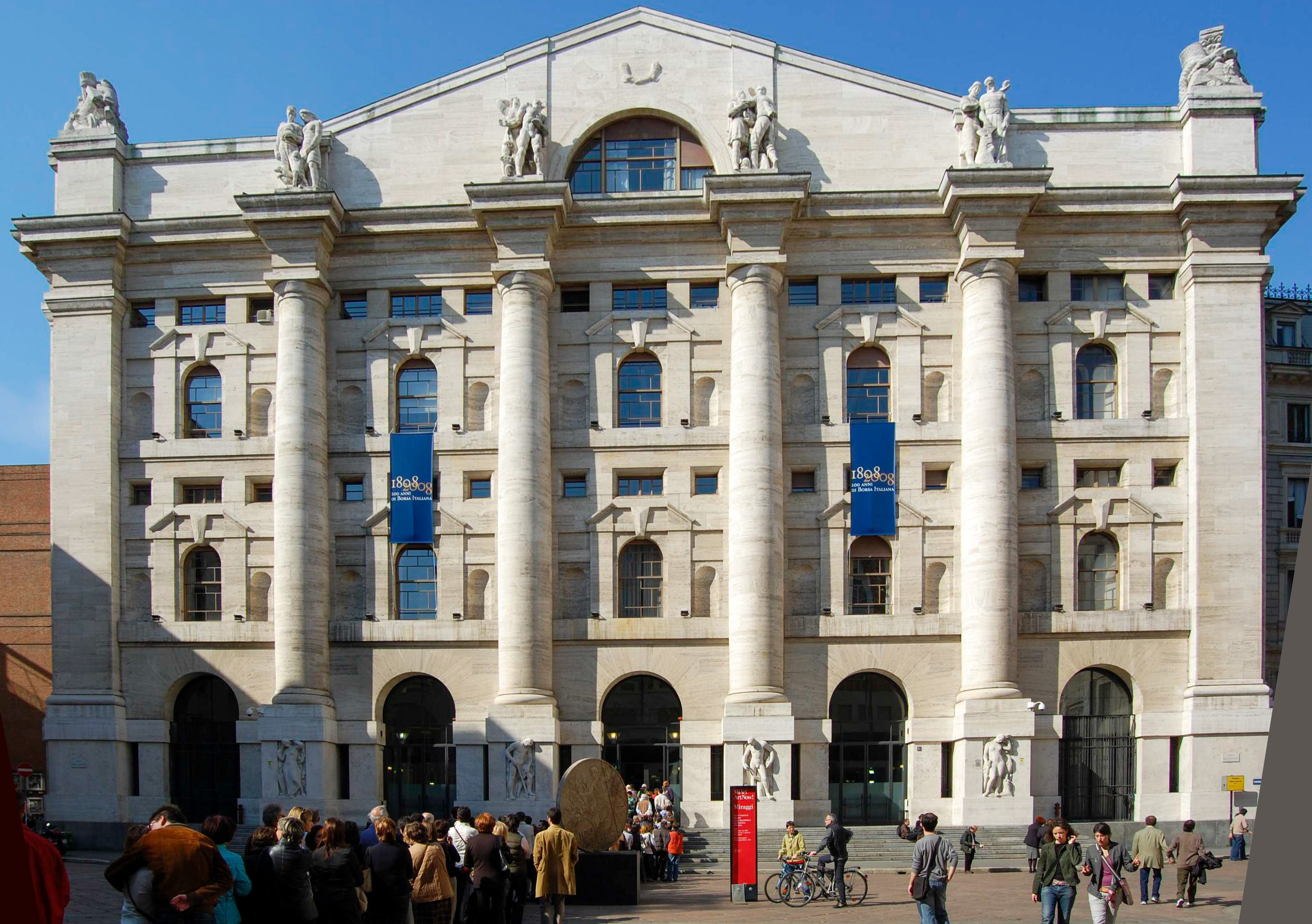
Palazzo Mezzanotte in Milan, the seat of the Italian Bourse

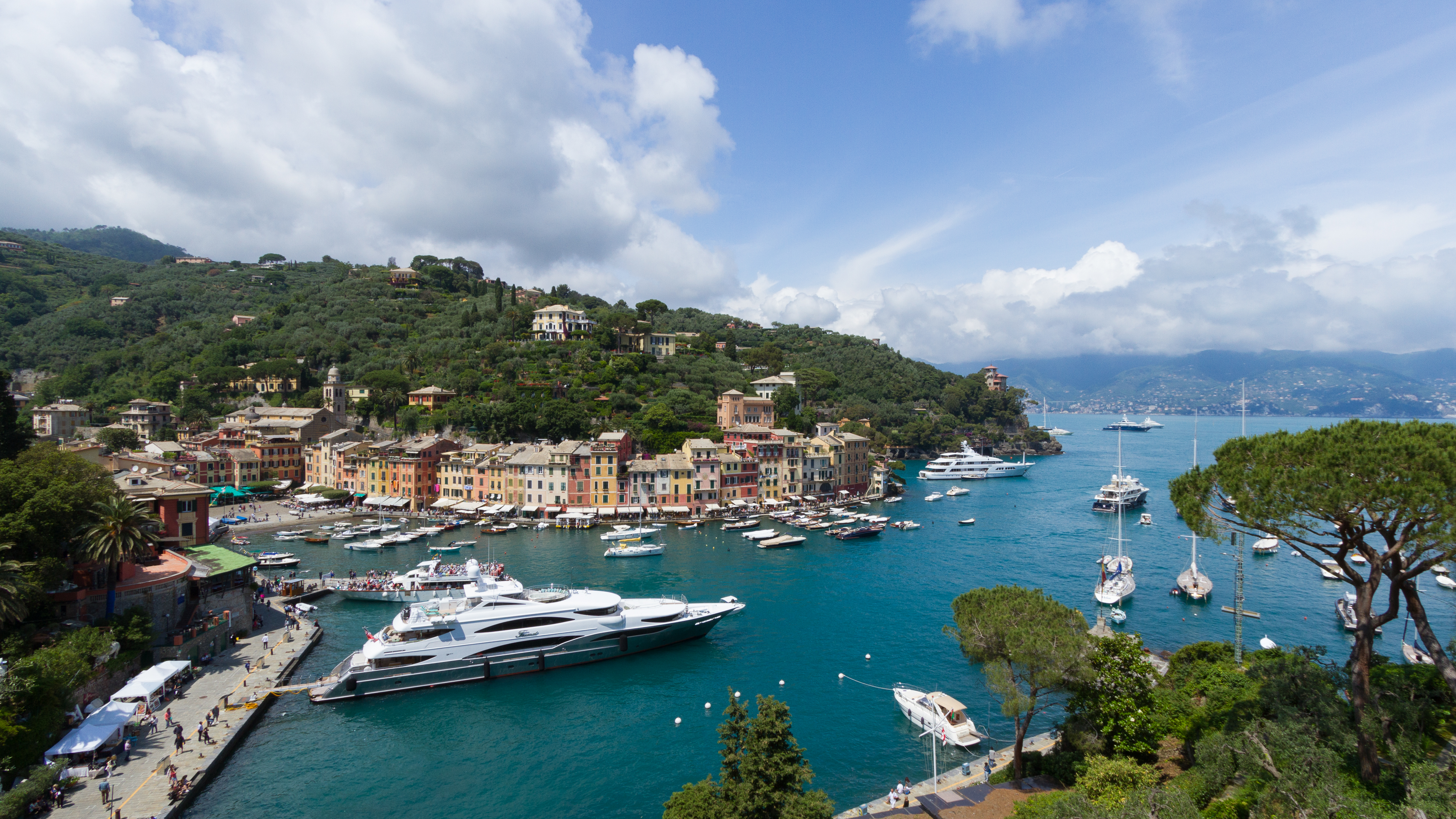
Portofino in Italian Riviera

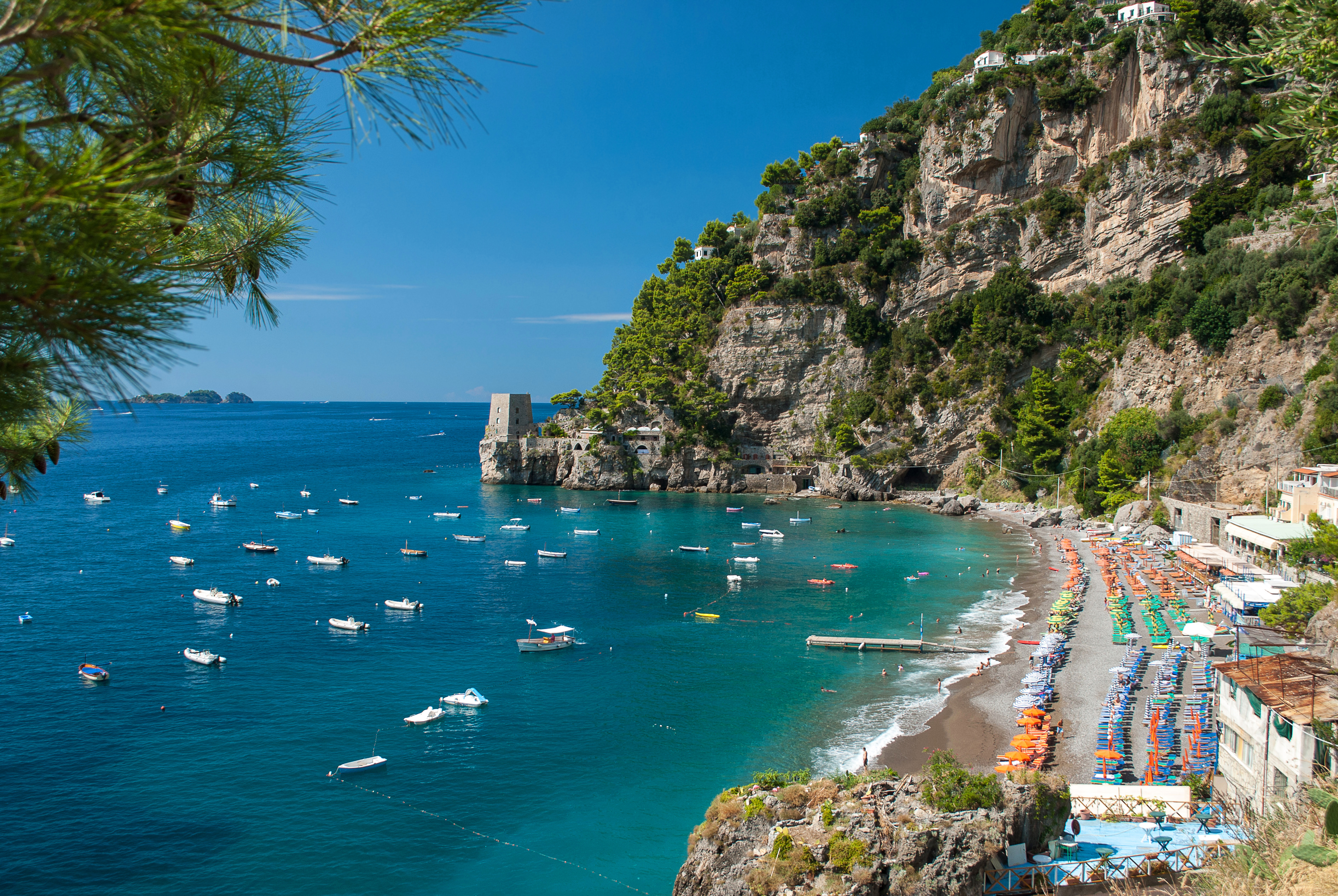
The Amalfi Coast, one of Italy's major tourist destinations

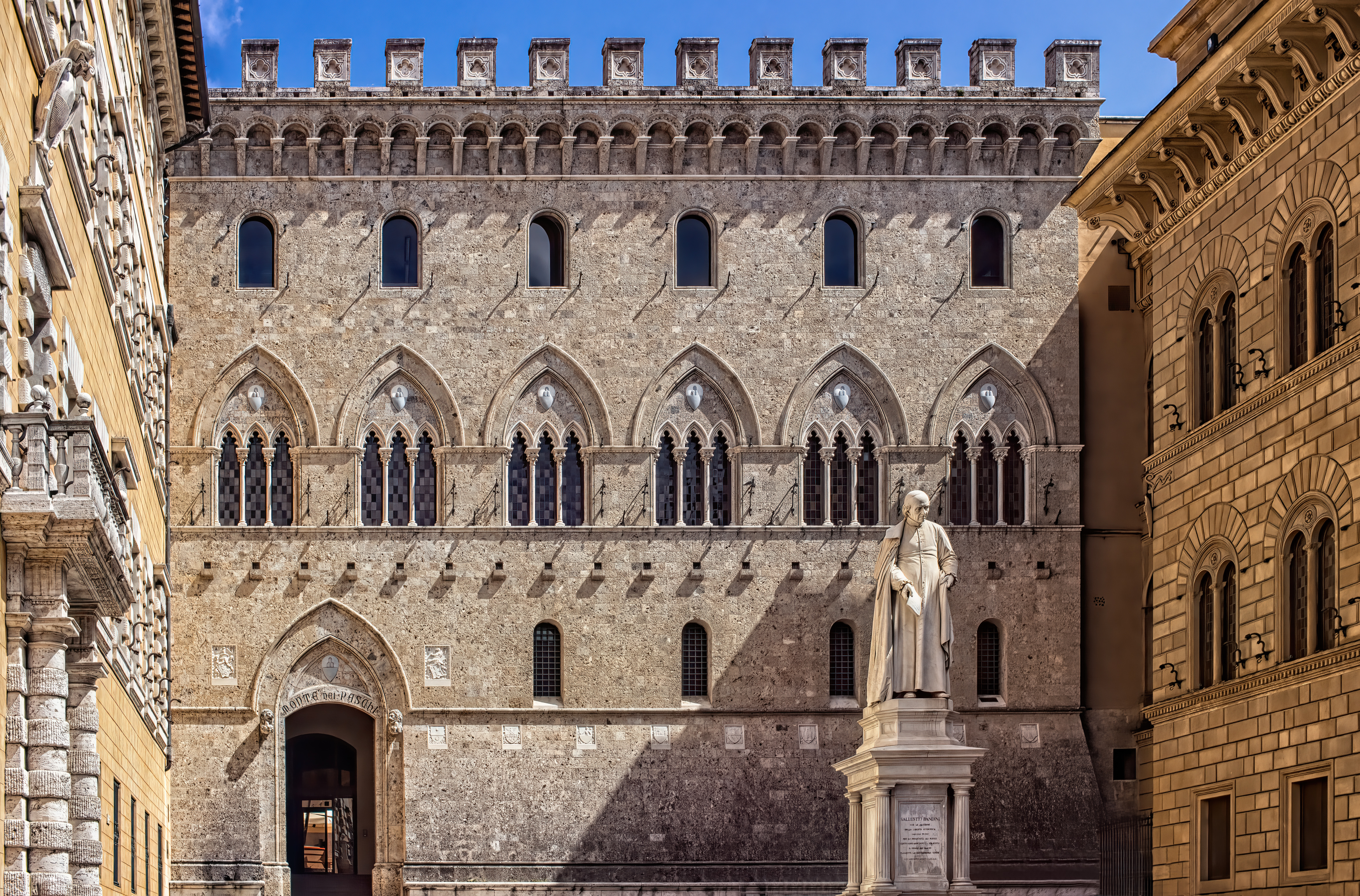
Banca Monte dei Paschi di Siena, founded in 1472, is the world's oldest or second oldest bank in continuous operation.

The headquarters of UniCredit bank in Milan

In Italy, services represent the most important sector of the economy, both in terms of number of employees (67% of the total) and value-added (71%). Furthermore, the sector is by far the most dynamic: over 51% of the more than 5,000,000 companies operating in Italy today belong to the services sector, and in this sector over 67% of new businesses are born. Very important activities in Italy are tourism, trade, services to people and businesses (advanced tertiary).

In 2006 the main sectoral data are: for trade, there are 1,600,000 enterprises, equal to 26% of the Italian entrepreneurial fabric, and over 3,500,000 work units. Transport, communications, tourism and consumption outside the home, over 582,000 businesses, equal to 9.5% of the entrepreneurial fabric, almost 3,500,000 work units. Business services: 630,000 registered companies, equal to 10.3% of the entrepreneurial fabric, over 2,800,000 work units. In 2004 the transport sector in Italy generated a turnover of about 119.4 billion euros, employing 935,700 persons in 153,700 enterprises.

Italian Bourse, based in Milan, is the Italian stock exchange. It manages and organises the domestic market, regulating procedures for admission and listing of companies and intermediaries and supervising disclosures for listed companies. Following exchange privatisation in 1997, the Italian Bourse was established and became effective on 2 January 1998. On 23 June 2007, the Italian Bourse became a subsidiary of the London Stock Exchange Group. As of April 2018, overall capitalisation for listed companies on Borsa Italiana was worth €644.3 billion, representing 37.8% of Italian GDP.

Italy is the fourth most visited country, with a total of 57 million arrivals in 2023. The total contribution of the tourism in Italy to GDP (including wider effects from investment, the supply chain and induced income impacts) was EUR162.7bn in 2014 (10.1% of GDP) and generated 1,082,000 jobs directly in 2014 (4.8% of total employment). Factors of tourist interest in Italy are mainly culture, cuisine, history, fashion, architecture, art, religious sites and routes, wedding tourism, naturalistic beauties, nightlife, underwater sites and spas. Winter and summer tourism are present in many locations in the Alps and the Apennines, while seaside tourism is widespread in coastal locations on the Mediterranean Sea. Italy is the leading cruise tourism destination in the Mediterranean Sea. Small, historical and artistic Italian villages are promoted through the association I Borghi più belli d'Italia (literally "The Most Beautiful Villages of Italy").

The origins of modern banking can be traced to medieval and early Renaissance Italy, to the rich cities like Florence, Lucca, Siena, Venice and Genoa. The Bardi and Peruzzi families dominated banking in 14th-century Florence, establishing branches in many other parts of Europe. One of the most famous Italian banks was the Medici Bank, set up by Giovanni di Bicci de' Medici in 1397. The earliest known state deposit bank, the Bank of Saint George, was founded in 1407 in Genoa, while Banca Monte dei Paschi di Siena, founded in 1472, is the world's oldest or second oldest bank in continuous operation, depending on the definition, and the third-largest Italian commercial and retail bank. Today, among the financial services companies, UniCredit is one of the largest banks in Europe by capitalization and Assicurazioni Generali is second largest insurance group in the world by revenue after Axa.

The following is a list of the main Italian banks and insurance groups ranked by total assets and gross premiums written.

Banks
| Rank | Company | Headquarters | Assets (€ mil.) |
|---|---|---|---|
| 1 | UniCredit | Milan | 982,151 |
| 2 | Intesa Sanpaolo | Turin | 676,798 |
| 3 | Banca Monte dei Paschi di Siena | Siena | 197,943 |
| 4 | Banco Popolare | Verona | 123,743 |
| 5 | UBI Banca | Bergamo | 121,323 |
| 6 | Banca Nazionale del Lavoro | Rome | 84,892 |
| 7 | Mediobanca | Milan | 72,428 |
| 8 | Banca Popolare dell'Emilia Romagna | Modena | 61,266 |
| 9 | Banca Popolare di Milano | Milan | 49,257 |
| 10 | Cariparma | Parma | 48,235 |

Insurance groups
| Rank | Company | Headquarters | Premiums (€ mil.) |
|---|---|---|---|
| 1 | Assicurazioni Generali | Trieste | 70,323 |
| 2 | Poste Vita | Rome | 18,238 |
| 3 | Unipol | Bologna | 15,564 |
| 4 | Intesa Sanpaolo | Turin | 12,464 |
| 5 | Cattolica Assicurazioni | Verona | 5,208 |
| 6 | Reale Mutua Assicurazioni | Turin | 3,847 |
| 7 | Vittoria Assicurazioni | Milan | 1,281 |

== Infrastructure ==
=== Energy and natural resources ===
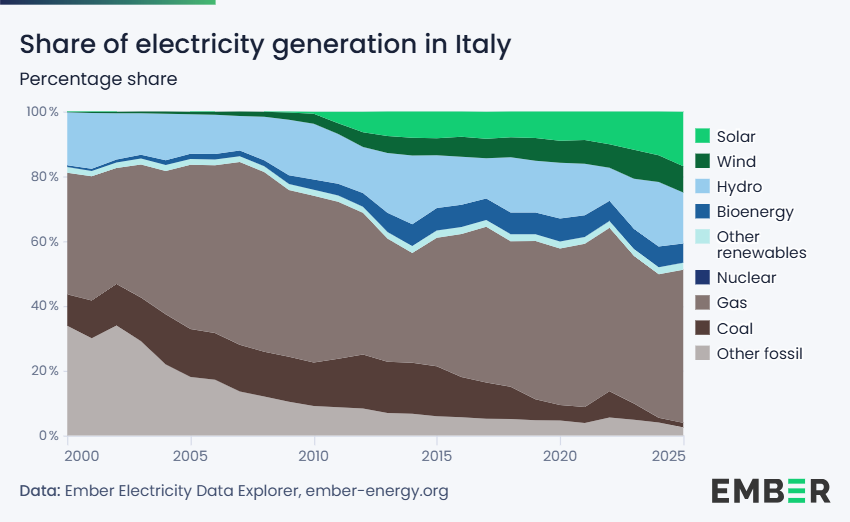
Electricity generation in Italy by source – percentage share

Italy consumed about 185 Mtoe of primary energy in 2010. This came mostly from fossil fuels. Among the most used resources are petroleum (mostly used for the transport sector), natural gas (used for electric energy production and heating), coal and renewables. Electricity is produced mainly from natural gas, which accounts for the source of more than half of the total final electric energy produced. Another important source is hydroelectric power, which was practically the only source of electricity until 1960.

Eni, with operations in 79 countries, is considered one of the seven "Supermajor" oil companies in the world, and one of the world's largest industrial companies. The Val d'Agri area, Basilicata, hosts the largest onshore hydrocarbon field in Europe. Moderate natural gas reserves, mainly in the Po Valley and offshore Adriatic Sea, have been discovered in recent years and constitute the country's most important mineral resource.

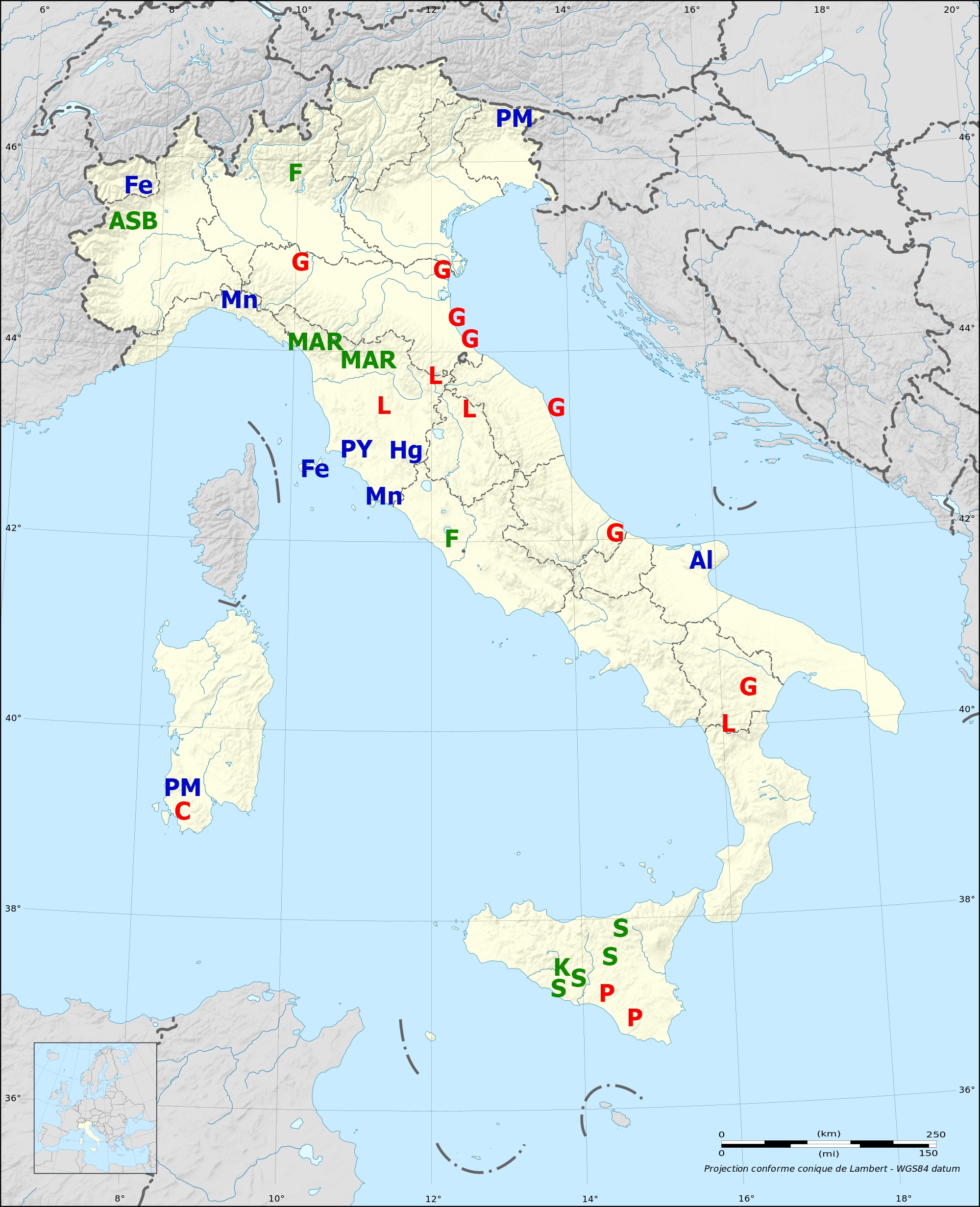
Natural resources of Italy. Metals are in blue (Al – aluminium ore, Mn — manganese, Fe – iron ore, Hg — mercury, PM – polymetallic ores (Cu, Zn, Ag, Pb), PY — pyrite). Fossil fuels are in red (C – coal, G – natural gas, L — lignite, P – petroleum). Non-metallic minerals are in green (ASB — asbestos, F — fluorite, K — potash, MAR — marble, S — sulfur).

Most raw materials needed for manufacturing and more than 80% of the country's energy sources are imported (99.7% of the solid fuels demand, 92.5% of oil, 91.2% of natural gas and 13% of electricity). Due to its reliance on imports, Italians pay approximately 45% more than the EU average for electricity. According to the European Union's report entitled REPowerEU - 4 years on, as of 2026, Italy has the highest electricity price in Europe.

In the last decade, Italy has become one of the world's largest producers of renewable energy, ranking as the second largest producer in the European Union and the ninth in the world. Wind power, hydroelectricity, and geothermal power are also important sources of electricity in the country. Italy was the first country to exploit geothermal energy to produce electricity. The first Italian geothermal power plant was built in Tuscany, which is where all currently active geothermal plants in Italy are located. In 2014 the geothermal production was 5.92 TWh.

Solar energy production alone accounted for almost 9% of the total electric production in the country in 2014, making Italy the country with the highest contribution from solar energy in the world. The Montalto di Castro Photovoltaic Power Station, completed in 2010, is the largest photovoltaic power station in Italy with 85 MW. Other examples of large PV plants in Italy are San Bellino (70.6 MW), Cellino san Marco (42.7 MW) and Sant' Alberto (34.6 MW). Italy was also the first country to exploit geothermal energy to produce electricity.

Renewable sources account for 27.5% of all electricity produced in Italy, with hydro alone reaching 12.6%, followed by solar at 5.7%, wind at 4.1%, bioenergy at 3.5%, and geothermal at 1.6%. The rest of the national demand is covered by fossil fuels (38.2% natural gas, 13% coal, 8.4% oil) and by imports.

Italy has managed four nuclear reactors until the 1980s, but in 1987, after the Chernobyl disaster, a large majority of Italians passed a referendum opting for phasing out nuclear power in Italy. The government responded by closing existing nuclear power plants and stopping work on projects underway, continuing to work to the nuclear energy program abroad. The national power company Enel operates seven nuclear reactors in Spain (through Endesa) and four in Slovakia (through Slovenské elektrárne), and in 2005 made an agreement with Électricité de France for a nuclear reactor in France. With these agreements, Italy has managed to access nuclear power and direct involvement in design, construction, and operation of the plants without placing reactors on Italian territory.

In the early 1970s Italy was a major producer of pyrites (from the Tuscan Maremma), asbestos (from the Balangero mines), fluorite (found in Sicily), and salt. At the same time, it was self-sufficient in aluminium (from Gargano), sulphur (from Sicily), lead, and zinc (from Sardinia). By the beginning of the 1990s, however, it had lost all its world-ranking positions and was no longer self-sufficient in those resources. There are no substantial deposits of iron, coal, or oil. Italy is one of the world's leading producers of pumice, pozzolana, and feldspar. Another mineral resource for which Italy is well-known is marble, especially the world-famous white Carrara marble from the Massa and Carrara quarries in Tuscany.

=== Transportation ===
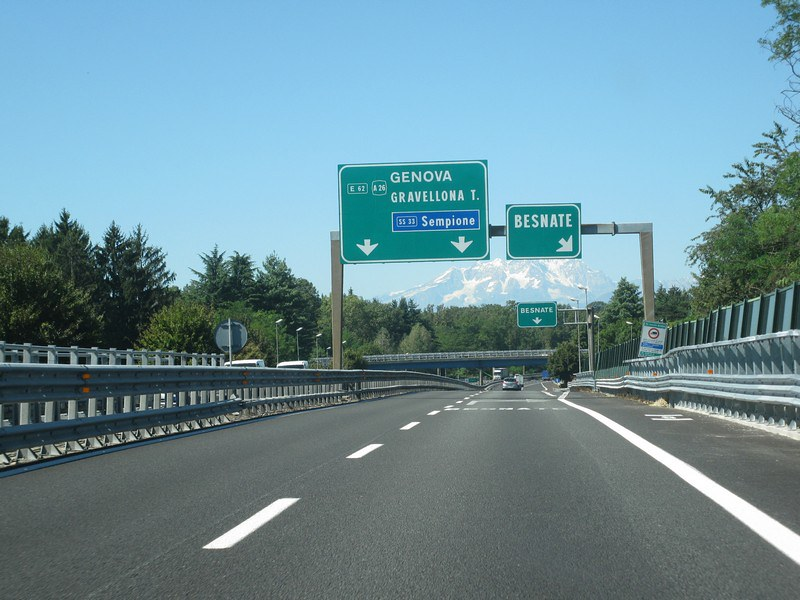
The Autostrada dei Laghi ("Lakes Motorway"; now parts of the Autostrada A8 and the Autostrada A9) near Besnate, the first motorway built in the world

Regarding the national road network, in 2002 there were 668,721 km (415,524 mi) of serviceable roads in Italy, including 6,487 km (4,031 mi) of motorways, state-owned but privately operated by Atlantia. In 2005, about 34,667,000 passenger cars (590 cars per 1,000 people) and 4,015,000 goods vehicles circulated on the national road network.

Italy was the first country in the world to build motorways, the so-called autostrade, reserved for fast traffic and for motor vehicles only. The Autostrada dei Laghi ("Lakes Motorway"), the first built in the world, connecting Milan to Lake Como and Lake Maggiore, and now parts of the A8 and A9 motorways, was devised by Piero Puricelli and was inaugurated in 1924. He received the first authorization to build a public-utility fast road in 1921. By the end of the 1930s, over 400 kilometres of multi- and dual-single-lane motorways were constructed throughout Italy, linking cities and rural towns. Italy is one of the countries with the most vehicles per capita, with 690 per 1000 people in 2010.

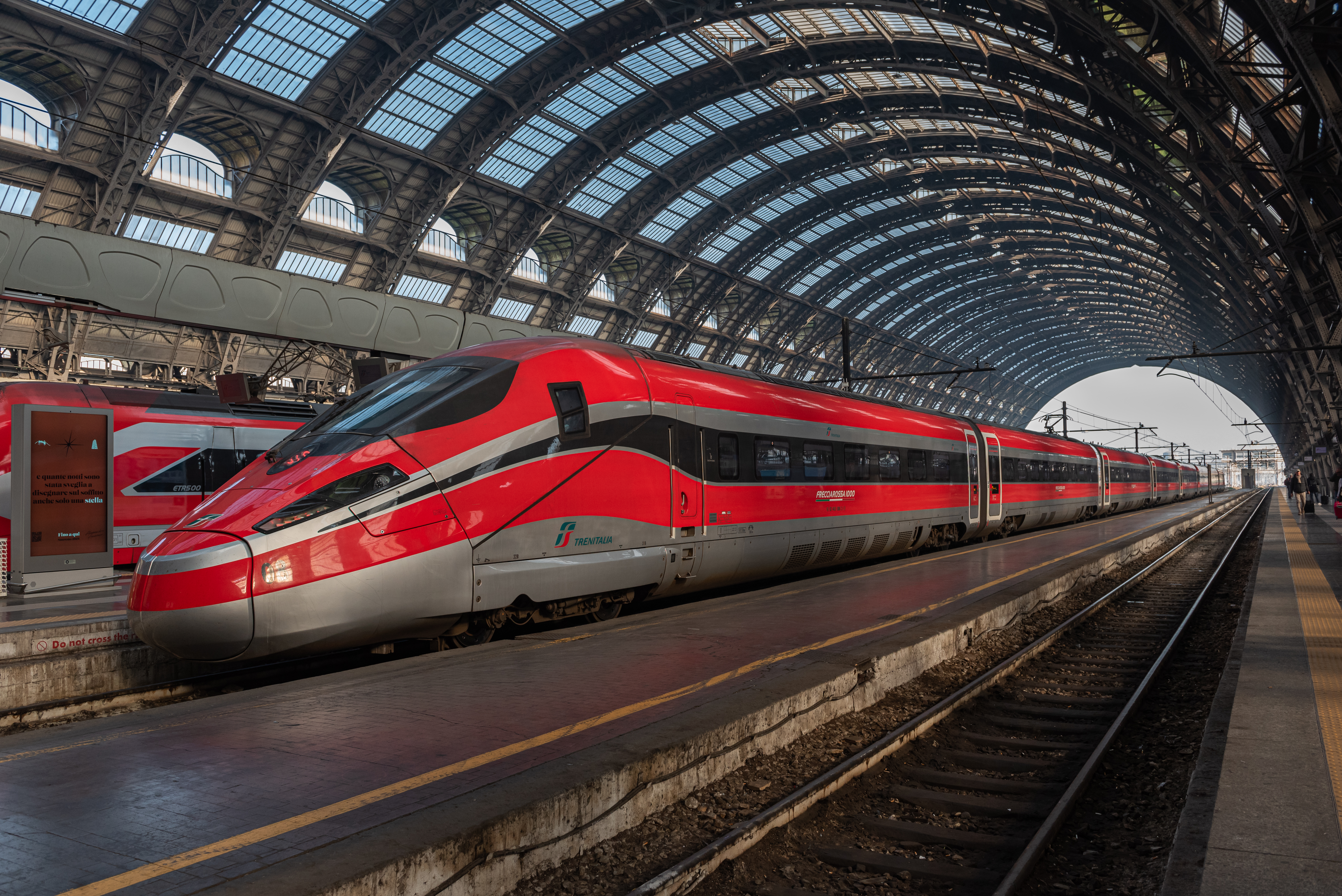
FS' Frecciarossa 1000 high speed train at Milano Centrale railway station, with a maximum speed of 400 km/h (249 mph), is one of the fastest trains in Europe.

The national railway network is also extensive, especially in the north, totalizing 16,862 km of which 69% are electrified and on which 4,937 locomotives and railcars circulate. It is the 12th largest in the world, and is operated by state-owned Ferrovie dello Stato, while the rail tracks and infrastructure are managed by Rete Ferroviaria Italiana. While a number of private railroads exist and provide mostly commuter-type services, the national railway also provides sophisticated high-speed rail service that joins the major cities. The Florence–Rome high-speed railway was the first high-speed line opened in Europe when more than half of it opened in 1977. In 1991 the TAV was created for the planning and construction of high-speed rail lines along Italy's most important and saturated transport routes (Milan-Rome-Naples and Turin-Milan-Venice). High-speed trains include ETR-class trains, with the Frecciarossa 1000 reaching 400 km/h. Higher-speed trains are divided into three categories: Frecciarossa (English: red arrow) trains operate at a maximum speed of 300 km/h on dedicated high-speed tracks; Frecciargento (English: silver arrow) trains operate at a maximum speed of 250 km/h on both high-speed and mainline tracks; and Frecciabianca (English: white arrow) trains operate on high-speed regional lines at a maximum speed of 200 km/h. Italy has 11 rail border crossings over the Alpine mountains with its neighbouring countries.

21st Century Silk Road with its connections to Italy

Since October 2021, Italy's flag carrier airline is ITA Airways, which took over the brand, the IATA ticketing code, and many assets belonging to the former flag carrier Alitalia, after its bankruptcy. ITA Airways serves 44 destinations (as of October 2021) and also operates the former Alitalia regional subsidiary, Alitalia CityLiner. The country also has regional airlines (such as Air Dolomiti), low-cost carriers, and Charter and leisure carriers (including Neos, Blue Panorama Airlines and Poste Air Cargo). Major Italian cargo operators are Alitalia Cargo and Cargolux Italia. Italy is the fifth in Europe by number of passengers by air transport, with about 148 million passengers or about 10% of the European total in 2011. There are approximately 130 airports in Italy, of which 99 have paved runways (including the two hubs of Leonardo Da Vinci International in Rome and Malpensa International in Milan).

Italy has been the final destination of the Silk Road for many centuries. In particular, the construction of the Suez Canal intensified sea trade with East Africa and Asia from the 19th century. Since the end of the Cold War and increasing European integration, trade relations, which were often interrupted in the 20th century, have intensified again. In 2004 there were 43 major seaports including the Port of Genoa, the country's largest and the third busiest by cargo tonnage in the Mediterranean Sea. Due to the increasing importance of the maritime Silk Road with its connections to Asia and East Africa, the Italian ports for Central and Eastern Europe have become important in recent years. In addition, the trade in goods is shifting from the European northern ports to the ports of the Mediterranean Sea due to the considerable time savings and environmental protection. In particular, the deep water port of Trieste in the northernmost part of the Mediterranean Sea is the target of Italian, Asian and European investments. The national inland waterway network comprises 1,477 km (918 mi) of navigable rivers and channels. In 2007 Italy maintained a civilian air fleet of about 389,000 units and a merchant fleet of 581 ships.

== Trade ==
Exports of Italy by product category (2019) Chemical products Transportation Machines Mineral products Plastics and rubbers Metals Foodstuffs Precious metals Textiles Instruments Animal products Vegetable products Paper goods Footwear and headwear Miscellaneous Stone and glass Wood products Animal and vegetable bi-products Animal hides Arts and antiques Weapons

In 2025, Italy was the 11th-largest trading nation in the world in terms of combined exports and imports.

Italy’s main trading partners in 2023 were Germany and France, followed by the United States, China and Spain.

== Poverty ==
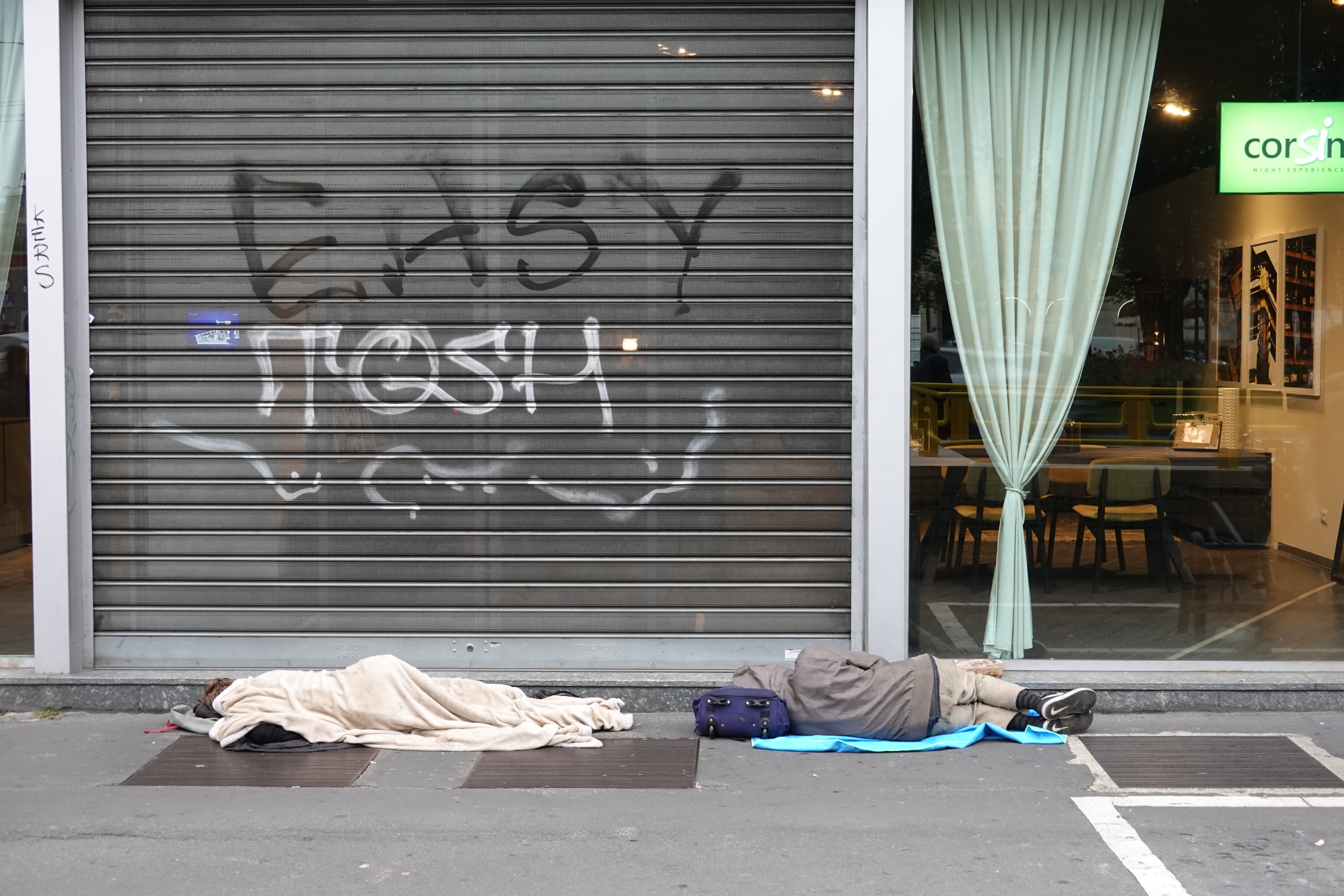
Two rough sleepers in Milan

In 2015, poverty in Italy hit the highest levels in the previous 10 years. The level of absolute poverty for a two-person family was €1050.95/month. The poverty line per capita changed by region from €552.39/month to €819.13/month. The number of those in absolute poverty rose nearly an entire per cent in 2015, from 6.8% in 2014 to 7.6% in 2015. In Southern Italy the numbers are even higher, with 10% living in absolute poverty, up from 9 per cent in 2014. Northern Italy is better off at 6.7%, but this is still an increase from 5.7% in 2014.

The national statistics reporting agency, ISTAT, defines absolute poverty as those who can not buy goods and services which they need to survive. In 2015, the proportion of poor households in relative poverty also increased to 13.7 from 12.9 in 2014. ISTAT defines relative poverty as people whose disposable income is less than around half the national average. The unemployment rate in February 2016 remained at 11.7%, which has been the same for almost a year, but even having a job does not guarantee freedom from poverty.

Those who have at least one family member employed still suffer from 6.1% to 11.7% poverty, the higher number being for those who have factory jobs. The numbers are even higher for the younger generations because their unemployment rate is over 40%. Also, children are hit hard. In 2014, 32% of those aged 0–17 were at risk of poverty or social exclusion, which is one child out of three. While in the north the poverty rate is about the same as that of France and Germany, in the south it is almost double that figure. In the last ISTAT report, poverty is in decline. According to the 2022 ISTAT Poverty Report, 2.18 million households and 5.6 million people live in absolute poverty in Italy.

According to Eurostat, by 2023, 63% of Italian households will struggle to make ends meet, making it one of the European countries with the most widespread economic difficulties, surpassing France, Poland, Spain and Portugal. The European average is 45.5%.

The average annual gross salary in Italy was €41,646 ($44,893) in 2022, placing the country at the twenty-first position in the OECD area, with lower wages compared to the EU average. Many Italians still face significant challenges in meeting basic living expenses due to high living costs and regional economic disparities.

== Nobel Prizes ==
Swiss Nobel laureates
| Year | Image | Laureate | Born | Died | Field | Rationale |
|---|---|---|---|---|---|---|
| 1985 | Portrait of Franco Modigliani | Franco Modigliani | 18 June 1918 in Rome since 1946 also American citizen | 25 September 2003 in Cambridge, United States | Economics | "for his pioneering analyses of saving and of financial markets" |

== See also ==
- Economic history of Italy
- Economic impacts of climate change in Italy
- Economy of fascist Italy
- Economy of Europe
- Il sorpasso (economics)
- Macroeconomic data in EMU
- PIGS (economics)
