= Unemployment benefits in Italy =

In Italy, unemployment benefits are guaranteed by the Constitution. Article 38 ("Economic relations") states "[...] workers have the right to the provision of financial support sufficient to meet their needs in case of accidents at work, ill health, disability, old age and involuntary unemployment [...]". Esping-Andersen traces in this persistency the origins of the chronically high Italian unemployment rates.

== Cash transfers based on contributions and citizens' income ==
The problem of unemployment has been primarily faced with governmental benefits, in the forms of cash transfers based on contributions (indennità di disoccupazione) and citizens' income.

== Redundancy fund ==
Since 1947, and with reforms in 1975, cash benefits are also provided as shock absorbers to those workers who are suspended or who work only for reduced time due to temporary difficulties of their factories. This institute, the Redundancy Fund (Cassa integrazione guadagni, CIG), aims to help the factories in financial difficulties, by relieving them from the costs of unused workforce, supporting as well those workers that might lose part of their income. In fact, it might also hide unemployment and have been used as a form of occult financing for company reorganizations between the 1960s and 1980s. The workers entitled to Redundancy Fund receive the 50% of their previous wages (80% before 1988), under a maximum level established by the law, and their contributions for pensions are taken for paid, even if they are not (contributi figurativi). The Ordinary Redundancy Fund applies for temporary events not attributable to the employer or to the workers, like a temporary market crisis. It can apply for a maximum of twelve months in two years, for a maximum period of three months continuously. The Extraordinary Redundancy Fund applies, at the contrary, to other cases in which the production completely stops, also for a long period and also due to the employer’s decisions, after the authorization of the Ministry of Labour, such as industrial reorganizations, technological unemployment, crisis of the sector, bankruptcy, etc. It applies only to companies with more than 15 employees, and only to employees with more than ninety days of previous employment; it needs a preventive communication to trade unions, with which the employer has to make a common examination of the situation and to create a project to face the consequences for workers. The period of application of the Extraordinary Redundancy Fund varies according to its causes, but cannot be more than 36 months in a period of five years.

== Solidarity contracts ==
Along with the Redundancy Funds, since 1984 companies can apply also for Solidarity Contracts (Contratti di solidarietà): after a negotiation with the local trade unions, the company can establish contracts with reduced work time, in order to avoid dismissing redundancy workers. The state will grant to those workers the 60% of the lost part of the wage. Such contracts can last up to four years, five in the South. Since 1993, the same Solidarity Contracts can be made also by companies not entitled to Redundancy Funds. In this case, the state and the company will grant the 25% each of the lost part of wage to the workers, for up to two years.

== Mobility allowances ==
If the Redundancy Fund doesn’t allow the company to re-establish a good financial situation, the workers can be entitled to mobility allowances (Indennità di mobilità), if they have a continuative employment contract and they have been employed in the previous twelve months. Other companies are provided incentives for employing them. The period of mobility allowance is up to 12 months; 24 for workers with more than 40 years, 36 for workers with more than 50 years; it can be raised also for workers from depressed areas such as the South. To remain entitled to allowances, the worker cannot refuse to attend at a formation course, or to take over a similar job with a wage over the 90% of the previous one, or to communicate to the Social Security Board to have found a temporary or a part-time job.

== See also ==
- Social Model
- Italian welfare state
- Unemployment benefits
- Youth unemployment in Italy
