= Italian government debt =

The Italian government debt is the public debt owed by the government of Italy to all public and private lenders. This excludes unfunded state pensions owed to the public. As of January 2014, the Italian government debt stands at €2.1 trillion (131.1% of GDP). Italy has the lowest share of public debt held by non-residents of all eurozone countries and the country's national wealth is four times larger than its public debt.

== Composition ==
The Italian public debit is in 2017 owned by the private sector only for the 6% of the total amount. This percentage decreased significantly from 1988, where this share was 57%.

Main holders of Italian public debt in June 2019 (Bank of Italy statistics) are: households= 4.4%, Italian banks= 30.6% (which includes a 12.8% share of public debt made of bank loans to local administrations), Italian insurance companies= 13.7%, investment funds (with mainly Italian beneficiaries)= 13.2%, foreign (banks, insurance, etc.)= 20%, Eurosystem (Bank of Italy through liabilities owed to European Central Bank, and paying interest to the Italian treasury)= 17.7%. The total share of Italian public debt detained by foreign holders, including the European Central Bank, is 45%.

== History and government action ==
The debt to GDP ratio of selected countries, 2023

=== 2010 ===
Italy ran a budget deficit of 4.6% of GDP in 2010. Italian debt was almost 120% of GDP ($2.4 trillion in 2010). This led investors to view Italian debt bonds as a risky asset.

=== 2011 ===
On 15 July and 14 September 2011, Italy's government passed austerity measures meant to save €124 billion. On 8 November 2011 the Italian bond yield was 6.74% for 10-year bonds, climbing above the 7% level where the country is thought to lose access to financial markets.

On 11 November 2011, Italian 10-year borrowing costs fell sharply from 7.5% to 6.7% after Italian legislature approved further austerity measures and the formation of an emergency government to replace that of Prime Minister Silvio Berlusconi.

The measures include a pledge to raise €15 billion from real-estate sales over the next three years, a two-year increase in the retirement age to 67 by 2026, opening up closed professions within 12 months and a gradual reduction in government ownership of local services. The interim government expected to put the new laws into practice was led by former European Union Competition Commissioner Mario Monti.

=== 2012 ===
Government debt reached 127.0% of GDP in 2012.

=== 2013 ===
Government debt reached 130.4% of GDP in 2013.

=== 2014 ===
Government debt reached 131.1% of GDP in 2014.

The Italian government has sought to privatise government assets in 2014 in order to reduce debt, including a sale of the Italian government's minority stake of Poste Italiane stock.

In January 2014 the Italian government also agreed to offer citizens a chance to use a new voluntary disclosure scheme to repatriate assets held abroad, often in Swiss banks. Italy has offered several tax amnesties over the past few years, and a tax amnesty in 2012 resulted in €100 billion in assets being declared and made legal at a steeply discounted tax rate. In 2014, the Bank of Italy estimated that Italians held €180 billion in undeclared assets abroad, a figure that was three times as high as in 2004.

=== 2026 ===
According to the 2026 Public Finance Document (Documento di Finanza Pubblica, Dpf) published in April 2026 by the Meloni government, it is expected that, in the current year, Italy's public debt will exceed 3,100 billion euros, with a debt-to-GDP ratio of 138.6%, up from 137.1% at the end of 2025, the highest in the Eurozone.

== See also ==
- Taxation in Italy
- Italian welfare state

Europe:

- Eurozone crisis
