= Economic history of Italy =

Historical real GDP per capita development of Italy from 1 AD to 2018

This is a history of the economy of Italy. For more information on historical, cultural, demographic and sociological developments in Italy, see the chronological era articles in the template to the right. For more information on specific political and governmental regimes in Italy, see the Kingdom and Fascist regime articles. The economic history of pre-unitarian Italy traces the economic and social changes of the Italian territory from Roman times to the unification of Italy (1860).

Until the end of the 16th century, Italy was highly prosperous relative to other parts of Europe. From the end of the 16th century, Italy stagnated relative to other parts of Europe. Italy remained a leading European economy until the first half of the 19th century when it was overtaken by France and Germany. At the time of Italian unification, Italy's GDP per capita was about half of that of Britain. By the 1980s, Italy had similar GDP per capita as Great Britain. Since the mid-1990s, the Italian economy has declined in both relative and absolute terms, as well as experienced a decline in aggregate productivity.

Within Italy, the South and North diverge considerably in terms of economic fortune. The divergence began to emerge in the 15th century and gradually enlarged over the subsequent centuries.

== From ancient Rome to Middle Ages ==
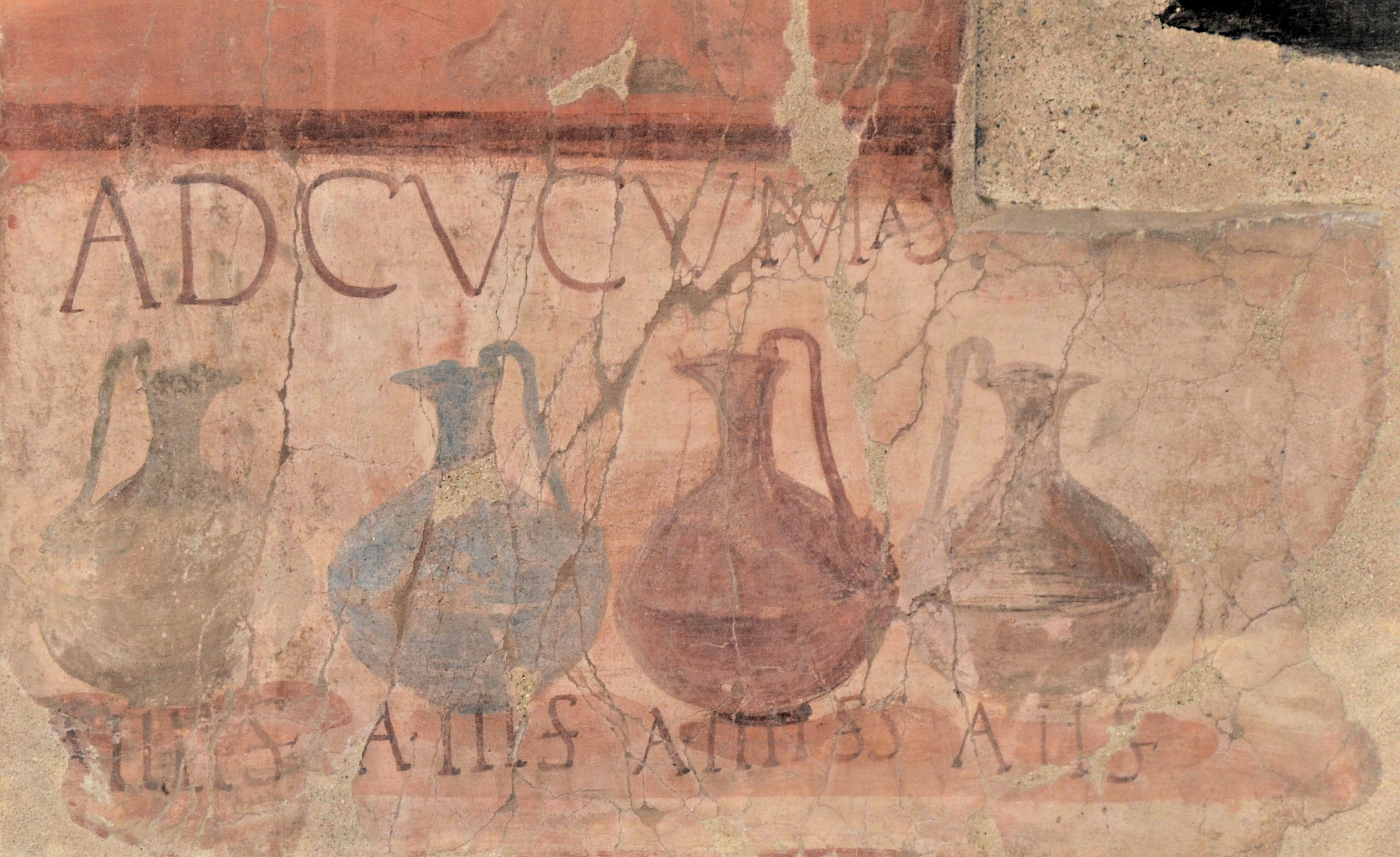
Ancient Roman advertisement for wine

In Roman times, the Italian Peninsula had a higher population density and economic prosperity than the rest of Europe and the Mediterranean Basin, especially during the 1st and 2nd centuries. Beginning in the 3rd century CE, the Roman Empire began to decline, and so did the Italian territory and its cities.

During the early Middle Ages (7th–9th centuries), the economy was in a depressed, semi-subsistence state, gravitating around feudal centers. Beginning in the 10th century, the Italian population and economy began to grow again, along with urban centers. Extensive trade networks developed over time, linking Italian centers to a network of relations from Asia to northern Europe. These centers of manufacturing, financial, mercantile and cultural activities made the Italian economy more prosperous than other European countries.

The arrival of the Black Death in the mid-1300s decimated the population, but it was soon followed by an economic revival. This growth produced a prosperous Renaissance economy that was advanced compared to European countries. Italy's leading sectors were textiles (woollen and silk workmanship, widely exported), banking services, and maritime transport.

== Renaissance ==
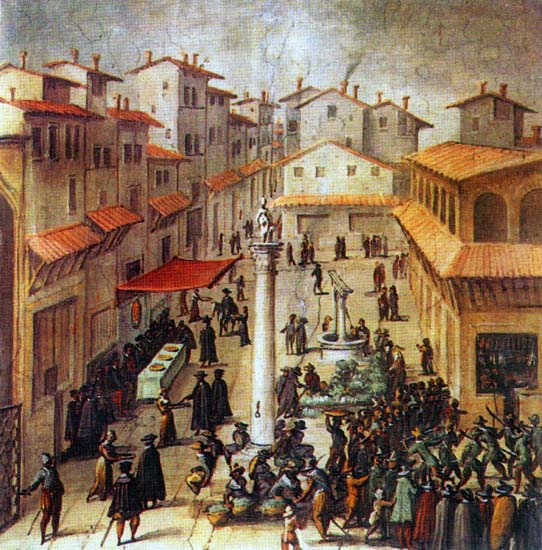
Florence, Piazza del Mercato Vecchio (1555), fresco by Stradanus, Palazzo Vecchio, Sala di Gualdrada

The Italian Renaissance was remarkable in economic development. Venice and Genoa were the trade pioneers, first as maritime republics and then as regional states, followed by Milan, Florence, and the rest of northern Italy. Some reasons for their early development are the relative military safety of Venetian lagoons, the high population density and the institutional structure which inspired entrepreneurs. The Republic of Venice was the first real international financial center, which slowly emerged from the 9th century to its peak in the 14th century. Tradeable bonds as a commonly used type of security, were invented by the Italian city-states (such as Venice and Genoa) of the late medieval and early Renaissance periods.

== 17th–middle 19th century ==
After 1600 Italy experienced an economic catastrophe. In 1600 Northern and Central Italy comprised one of the most advanced industrial areas of Europe. There was an exceptionally high standard of living. By 1870 Italy was an economically backward and depressed area; its industrial structure had almost collapsed, its population was too high for its resources, its economy had become primarily agricultural. Wars, political fractionalization, limited fiscal capacity and the shift of world trade to north-western Europe and the Americas were key factors.

== 1861–1918 ==
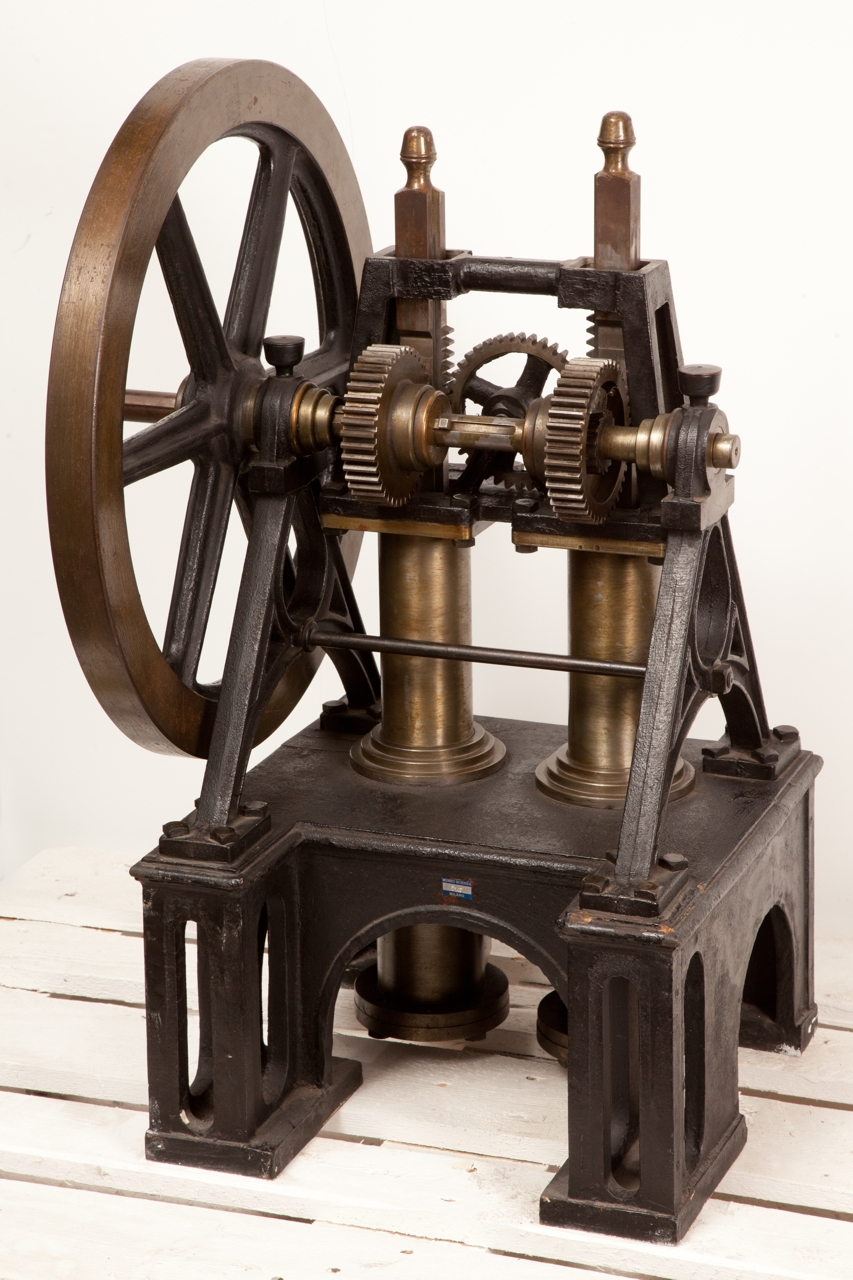
The Barsanti-Matteucci engine, the first proper internal combustion engine

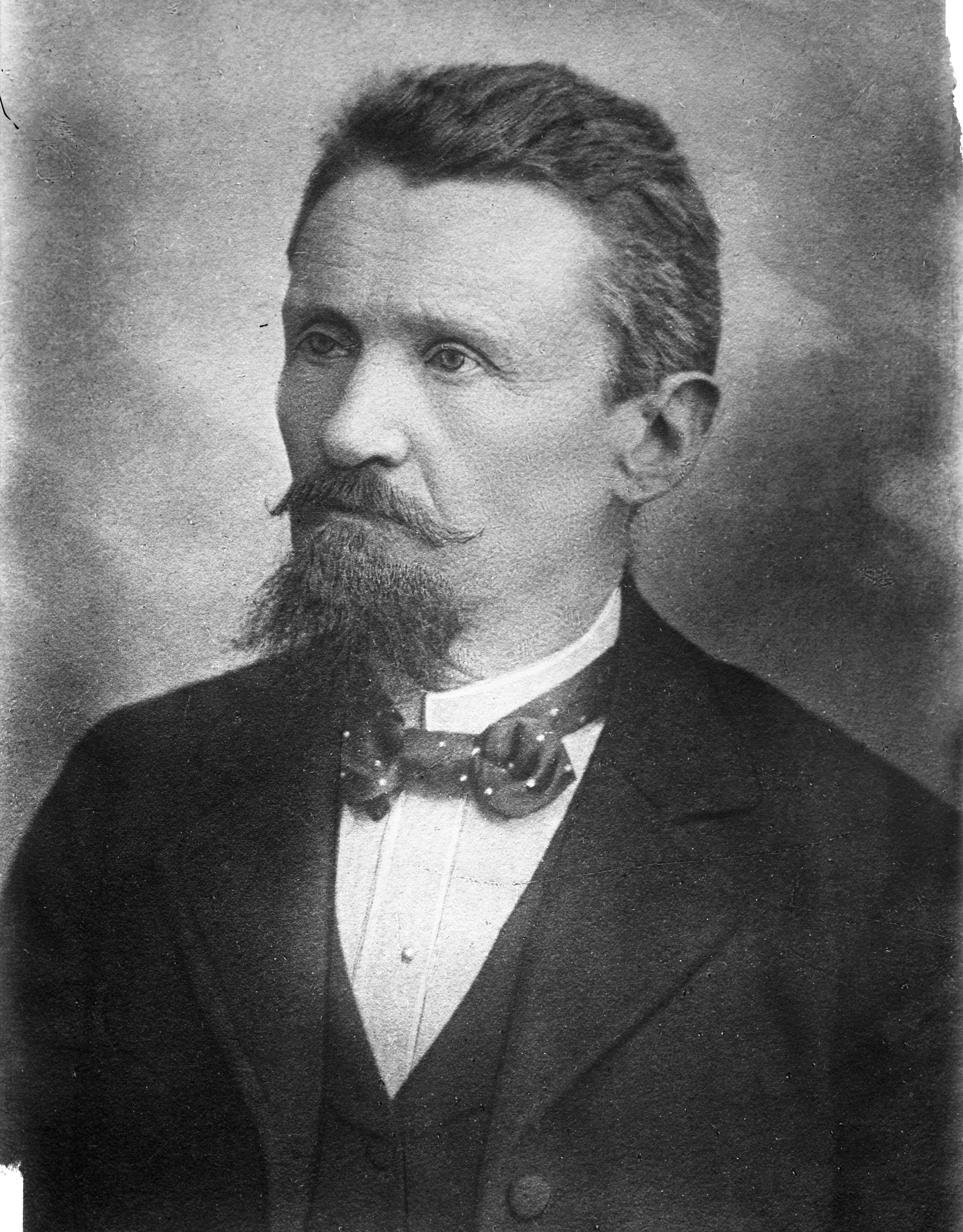
Alessandro Cruto, creator of the first practical long-lasting incandescent Light Bulb

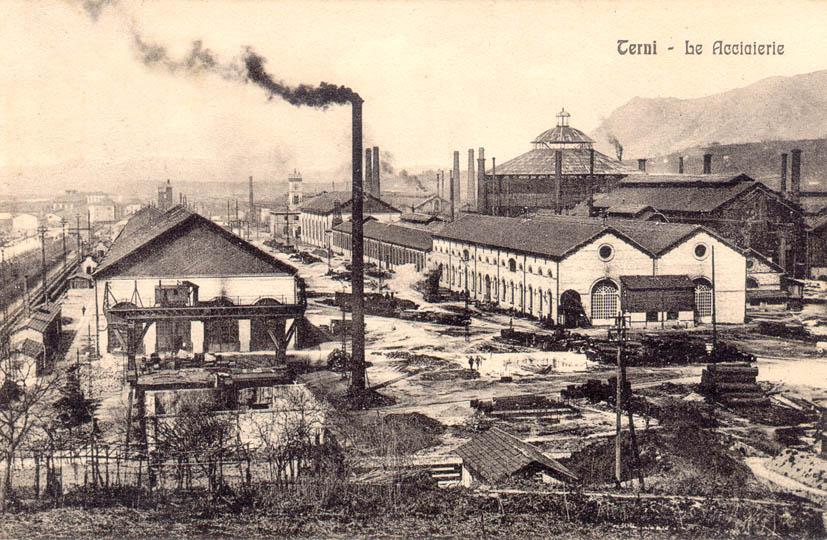
Terni steel mills in 1912

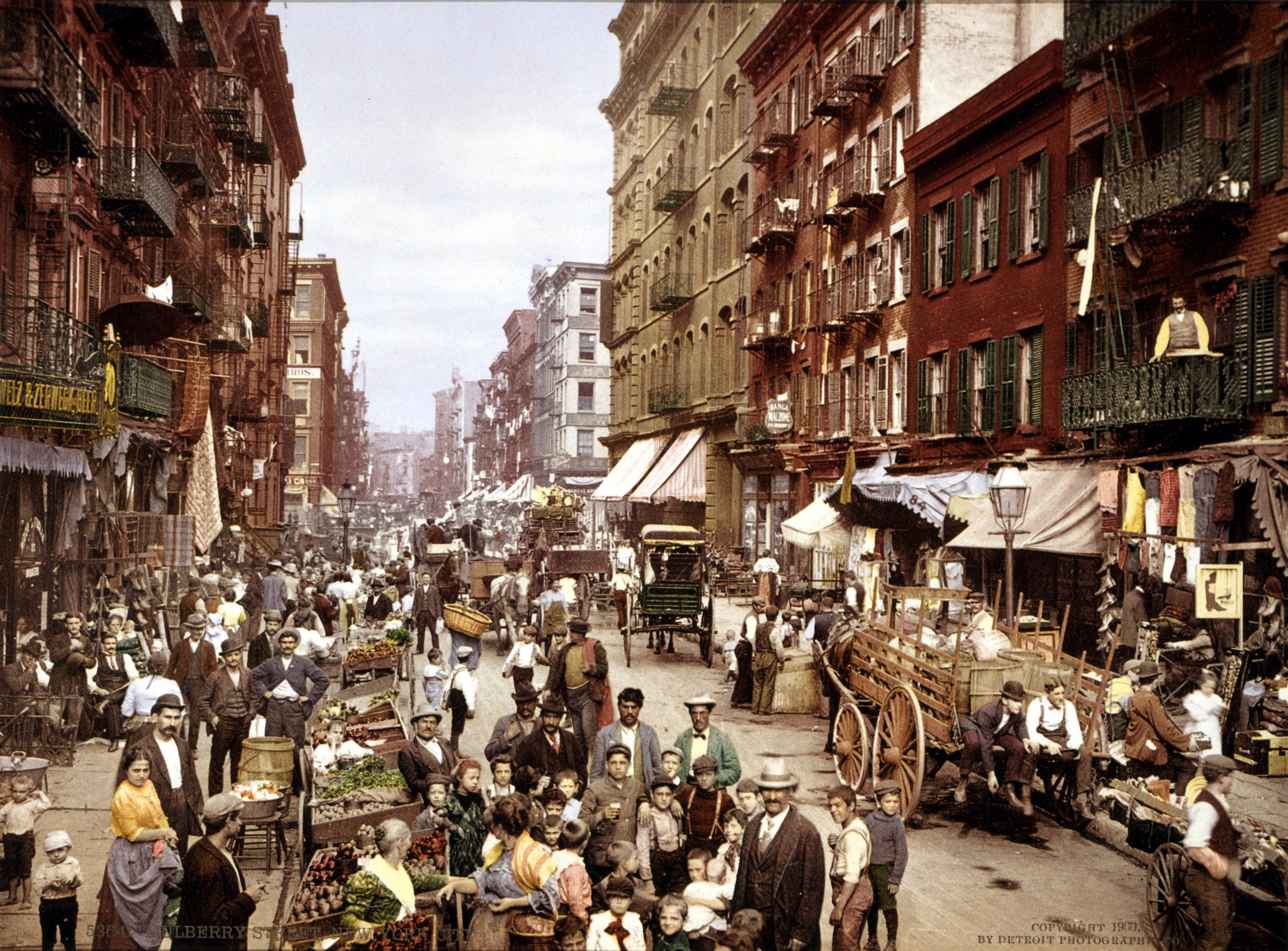
Little Italy, Manhattan, New York, c. 1900

The economic history of Italy after 1861 can be divided in three main phases: an initial period of struggle after the unification of the country, characterised by high emigration and stagnant growth; a central period of robust catch-up from the 1890s to the 1980s, interrupted by the Great Depression of the 1930s and the two world wars; and a final period of sluggish growth that has been exacerbated by a double-dip recession following the 2008 global financial crush, and from which the country is slowly reemerging only in recent years.

=== Age of Industrialisation ===
Prior to unification, the economy of the many Italian statelets was overwhelmingly agrarian; however, the agricultural surplus produced what historians call a "pre-industrial" transformation in North-western Italy starting from the 1820s, that led to a diffuse, if mostly artisanal, concentration of manufacturing activities, especially in Piedmont-Sardinia under the liberal rule of the Count of Cavour.

After the birth of the unified Kingdom of Italy in 1861, there was a deep consciousness in the ruling class of the new country's backwardness, given that the per capita GDP expressed in PPS terms was roughly half of that of Britain and about 25% less than that of France and Germany. During the 1860s and 1870s, the manufacturing activity was backward and small-scale, while the oversized agrarian sector was the backbone of the national economy. The country lacked large coal and iron deposits and the population was largely illiterate. In the 1880s, a severe farm crisis led to the introduction of more modern farming techniques in the Po Valley, while from 1878 to 1887 protectionist policies were introduced with the aim to establish a heavy industry base. Some large steel and iron works soon clustered around areas of high hydropower potential, notably the Alpine foothills and Umbria in central Italy, while Turin and Milan led a textile, chemical, engineering and banking boom and Genoa captured civil and military shipbuilding.

However, the diffusion of industrialisation that characterised the northwestern area of the country largely excluded Venetia and, especially, the South. The resulting Italian diaspora involved 29 million Italians (10.2 million of whom returned) between 1860 and 1985 and 9 million permanently left of 14 million who emigrated between 1876 and 1914 two-thirds of whom were men; by many scholars it is considered the biggest mass migration of contemporary times. During the Great War, the still frail Italian state successfully fought a modern war, being able of arming and training some 5 million recruits. But this result came at a terrible cost: by the end of the war, Italy had lost 700,000 soldiers and had a ballooning sovereign debt amounting to billions of lira.

=== The agrarian crisis and the Italian diaspora ===
Map of the Italian diaspora in the world

The unification of Italy in 1861–70 broke down the feudal land system that had survived in the south since the Middle Ages, especially where land had been the inalienable property of aristocrats, religious bodies, or the king. The breakdown of feudalism, however, and redistribution of land did not necessarily lead to small farmers in the south winding up with land of their own or land they could work and profit from. Many remained landless, and plots grew smaller and smaller and thus more and more unproductive as land was subdivided among heirs. The Italian diaspora did not affect all regions of the nation equally, principally low income agricultural areas with a high proportion of small peasant land holdings. In the second phase of emigration (1900 to World War I) most emigrants were from the south and most of them were from rural areas, driven off the land by inefficient land management policies. Robert Foerster, in Italian Emigration of our Times (1919) says, " [Emigration has been]…well nigh expulsion; it has been exodus, in the sense of depopulation; it has been characteristically permanent. ".

Mezzadria, a form of sharefarming where tenant families obtained a plot to work on from an owner and kept a reasonable share of the profits, was more prevalent in central Italy, which is one of the reasons why there was less emigration from that part of Italy. Although owning land was the basic yardstick of wealth, farming in the south was socially despised. People did not invest in agricultural equipment but in such things as low-risk state bonds.

=== Southern question ===
Normalized index of industrialization of the Italian provinces in 1871 (the national average is 1.0). Source: Bank of Italy. Over 1.4 From 1.1 to 1.4 From 0.9 to 1.1 Up to 0.9

In the decades following the unification of Italy, the northern regions of the country, Lombardy, Piedmont and Liguria in particular, began a process of industrialization and economic development while the southern regions remained behind. At the time of the unification of the country, there was a shortage of entrepreneurs in the south, with landowners who were often absent from their farms as they lived permanently in the city, leaving the management of their funds to managers, who were not encouraged by the owners to make the agricultural estates to the maximum. Landowners invested not in agricultural equipment, but in such things as low-risk state bonds.

In southern Italy, the unification of the country broke down the feudal land system, which had survived in the south since the Middle Ages, especially where land had been the inalienable property of aristocrats, religious bodies or the king. The breakdown of feudalism, however, and redistribution of land did not necessarily lead to small farmers in the south winding up with land of their own or land they could work and make profit from. Many remained landless, and plots grew smaller and smaller and so less and less productive, as land was subdivided among heirs.

This gap between northern and southern Italy, called "southern question", was also induced by the region-specific policies selected by the post-unitary governments. For example, the 1887 protectionist reform, instead of safeguarding the arboriculture sectors crushed by 1880s fall in prices, shielded the Po Valley wheat breeding and those Northern textile and manufacturing industries that had survived the liberal years due to state intervention. A similar logic guided the assignment of monopoly rights in the steamboat construction and navigation sectors and, above all, the public spending in the railway sector, which represented 53% of the 1861–1911 total.

The resources necessary to finance the public spending effort were obtained through highly unbalanced land property taxes. This affected the savings available for investment in growth sectors, which also lacked a developed banking system. Given the inability of the government to estimate the land profitability, especially because of the huge differences among the regional cadasters, this policy irreparably induced large regional discrepancies. This policy destroyed the relationship between the central state and the Southern population by unchaining first a civil war called Brigandage, which brought about 20,000 victims by 1864 and the militarization of the area, and then favouring emigration, especially from 1892 to 1921.

After the rise of Benito Mussolini, the "Iron Prefect" Cesare Mori tried to defeat the already powerful criminal organizations flourishing in the South with some degree of success. Fascist policy aimed at the creation of an Italian Empire and Southern Italian ports were strategic for all commerce towards the colonies. With the invasion of Southern Italy during World War II, the Allies restored the authority of the mafia families, lost during the Fascist period, and used their influence to maintain public order.

In the 1950s the Cassa per il Mezzogiorno was set up as a huge public master plan to help industrialize the South, aiming to do this in two ways: through land reforms creating 120,000 new smallholdings, and through the "Growth Pole Strategy" whereby 60% of all government investment would go to the South, thus boosting the Southern economy by attracting new capital, stimulating local firms, and providing employment. However, the objectives were largely missed, and as a result, the South became increasingly subsidized and state-dependent, incapable of generating private growth itself.

The imbalance between North and South was reduced in the 1960s and 1970s through the construction of public works, the implementation of agrarian and scholastic reforms, the expansion of industrialization and the improved living conditions of the population. This convergence process was interrupted, however, in the 1980s. To date, the per capita GDP of the South is just 58% of that of the Center-North, but this gap is mitigated by the fact that there the cost of living is around 10–15% lower on average (with even more differences between small towns and big cities) than that in the North of Italy. In the South the unemployment rate is more than double (6.7% in the North against 14.9% in the South). A study by Censis blames the pervasive presence of criminal organizations for the delay of Southern Italy, estimating an annual loss of wealth of 2.5% in the South in the period between 1981 and 2003 due to their presence, and that without them the per capita GDP of the South would have reached that of the North.

== Fascist Italy ==
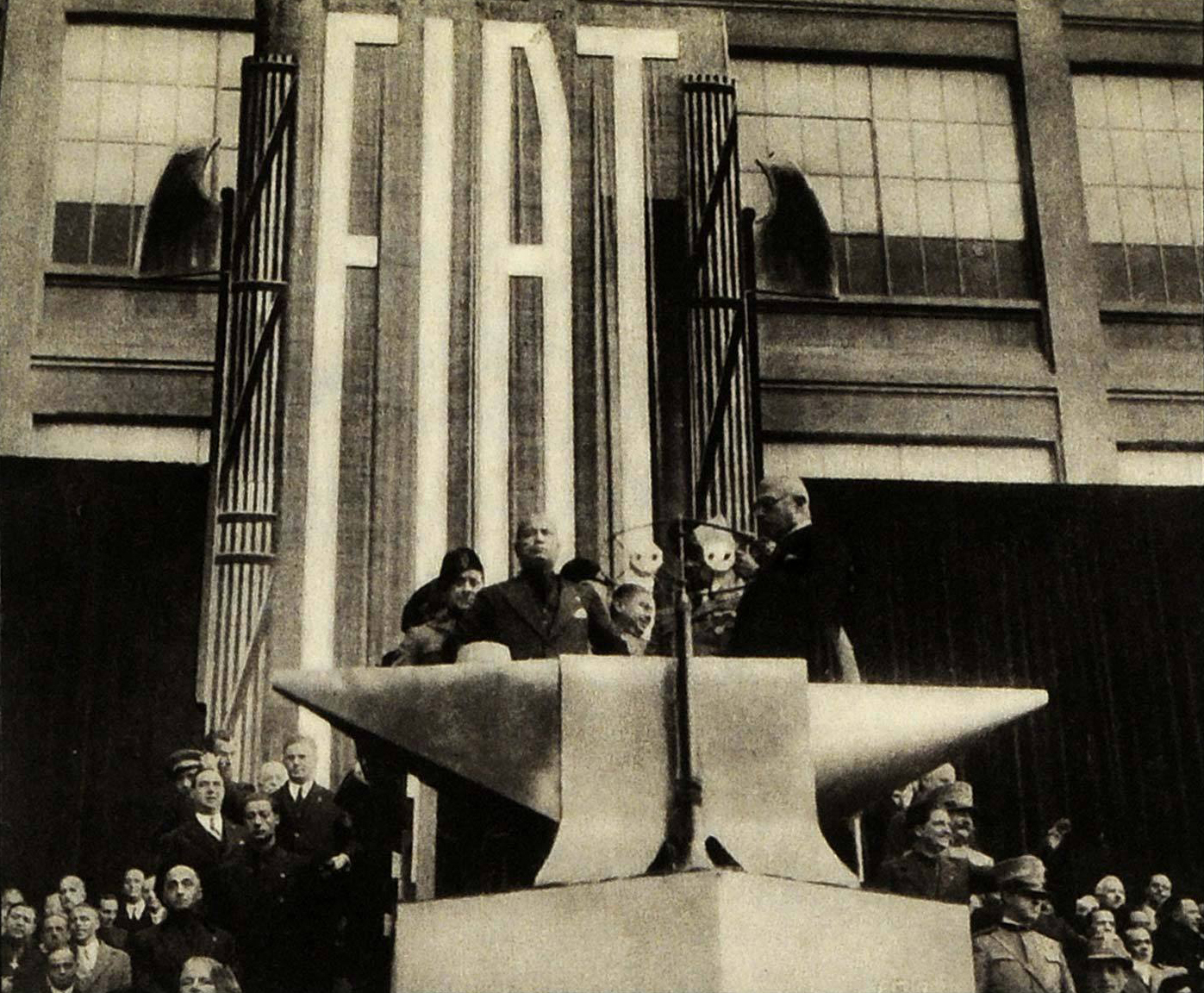
Benito Mussolini giving a speech at the Fiat Lingotto factory in Turin, 1932

Italy had emerged from World War I in a poor and weakened condition. The National Fascist Party of Benito Mussolini came to power in Italy in 1922, at the end of a period of social unrest. During the first four years of the new regime, from 1922 to 1925, the Fascist had a generally laissez-faire economic policy: they initially reduced taxes, regulations and trade restrictions on the whole. However, "once Mussolini acquired a firmer hold of power... laissez-faire was progressively abandoned in favour of government intervention, free trade was replaced by protectionism and economic objectives were increasingly couched in exhortations and military terminology." Italy reached a balanced budget in 1924–25 and was only partially hit by the 1929 crisis. The Fascist government nationalized the holdings of large banks which had accrued significant industrial securities, and a number of mixed entities were formed, whose purpose was to bring together representatives of the government and major businesses. These representatives discussed economic policy and manipulated prices and wages to satisfy both the wishes of the government and the wishes of business. This economic model based on a partnership between government and business was soon extended to the political sphere, in what came to be known as corporatism.

Throughout the 1930s, the Italian economy maintained the corporatist and autarchic model that had been established during the Great Depression. At the same time, however, Mussolini had growing ambitions of extending Italy's foreign influence through both diplomacy and military intervention. After the invasion of Ethiopia, Italy began supplying troops and equipment to the Spanish nationalists under General Francisco Franco, who were fighting in the Spanish Civil War against a leftist government. These foreign interventions required increased military spending, and the Italian economy became increasingly subordinated to the needs of its armed forces. By 1938, only 5.18% of workers were state employees. Only one million workers, out of a total 20 million, were employed in the public sector.

Finally, Italy's involvement in World War II as a member of the Axis powers required the establishment of a war economy. This put severe strain on the corporatist model, since the war quickly started going badly for Italy and it became difficult for the government to persuade business leaders to finance what they saw as a military disaster. The Allied invasion of Italy in 1943 caused the Italian political structure—and the economy—to rapidly collapse. The Allies, on the one hand, and the Germans on the other, took over the administration of the areas of Italy under their control. By the end of the war the Italian economy had been destroyed; per capita income in 1944 was at its lowest point since the beginning of the 20th century. In contrast to European democracies in the time period, Italy under fascist rule saw growing inequality.

== Post-World War II economic miracle ==
Main: Post-World War II economic growth and increased industrial production in Italy

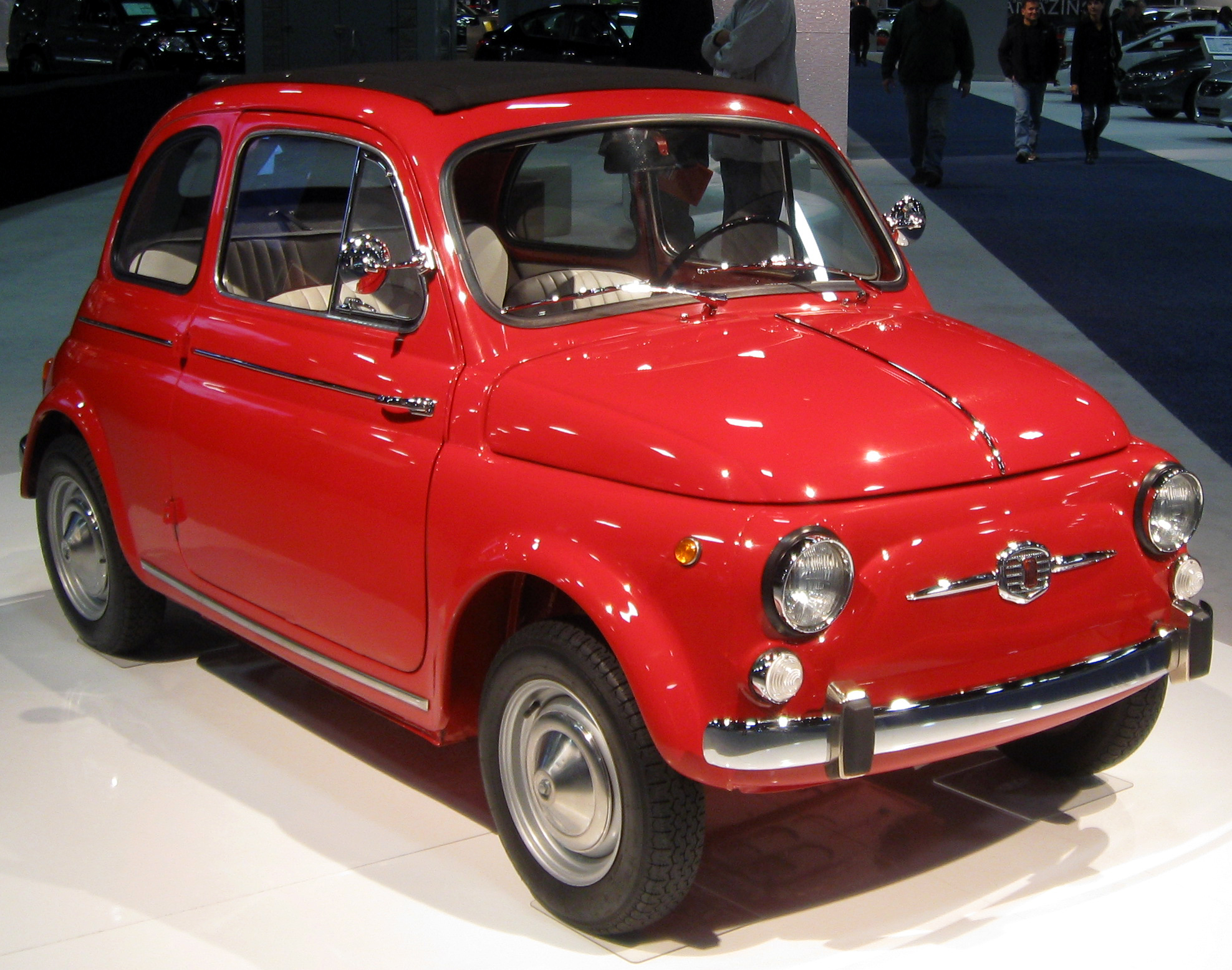
The Fiat 500, launched in 1957, is considered a symbol of Italy's postwar economic miracle.

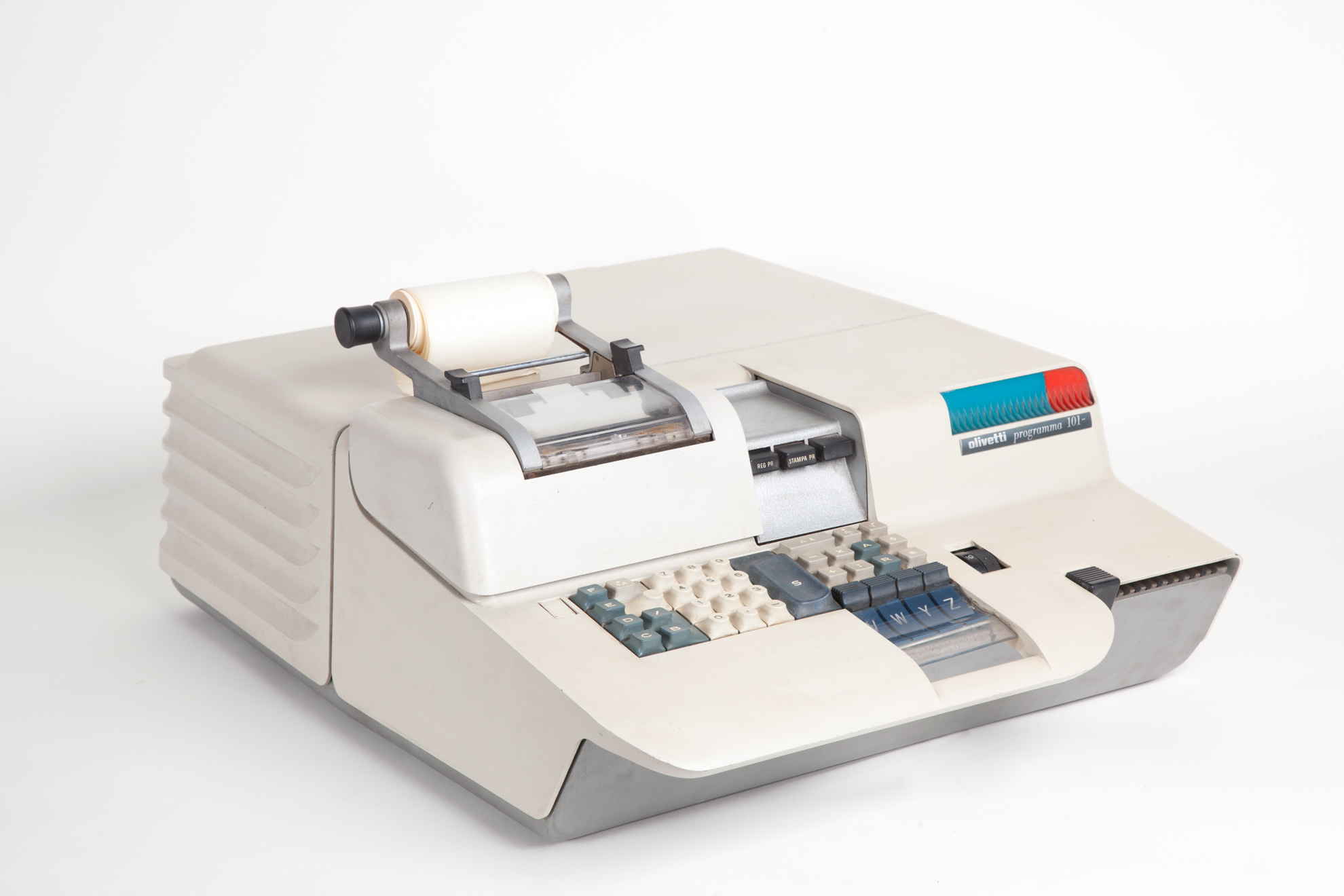
Programma 101, developed in 1965 by Olivetti, is considered one of the first programmable calculators ever and was an economic success internationally.

The Italian economy has had very variable growth. In the 1950s and early 1960s, the Italian economy was booming, with record high growth rates, including 6.4% in 1959, 5.8% in 1960, 6.8% in 1961, and 6.1% in 1962. This rapid and sustained growth was due to the ambitions of several Italian businesspeople, the opening of new industries (helped by the discovery of hydrocarbons, made for iron and steel, in the Po Valley), re-construction and modernization of most Italian cities, such as Milan, Rome and Turin, and the aid given to the country after World War II (notably the Marshall Plan).

After the end of World War II, Italy was in rubble and occupied by foreign armies, a condition that worsened the chronic development gap towards the more advanced European economies. However, the new geopolitical logic of the Cold War made possible that the former enemy Italy, a hinge-country between Western Europe and the Mediterranean, and now a new, fragile democracy threatened by the NATO occupation forces, the proximity of the Iron Curtain and the presence of a strong Communist party, was considered by the United States as an important ally for the Free World, and received under the Marshall Plan over US$1.2 billion from 1947 to 1951.

The end of aid through the Plan could have stopped the recovery but it coincided with a crucial point in the Korean War whose demand for metal and manufactured products was a further stimulus of Italian industrial production. In addition, the creation in 1957 of the European Common Market, with Italy as a founding member, provided more investment and eased exports.

These favorable developments, combined with the presence of a large labour force, laid the foundation for spectacular economic growth that lasted almost uninterrupted until the "Hot Autumn's" massive strikes and social unrest of 1969–70, which then combined with the later 1973 oil crisis and put an abrupt end to the prolonged boom. It has been calculated that the Italian economy experienced an average rate of growth of GDP of 5.8% per year between 1951 and 1963, and 5% per year between 1964 and 1973. Italian rates of growth were second only, but very close, to the German rates, in Europe, and among the OEEC countries only Japan had been doing better.

=== 1964–1991 ===
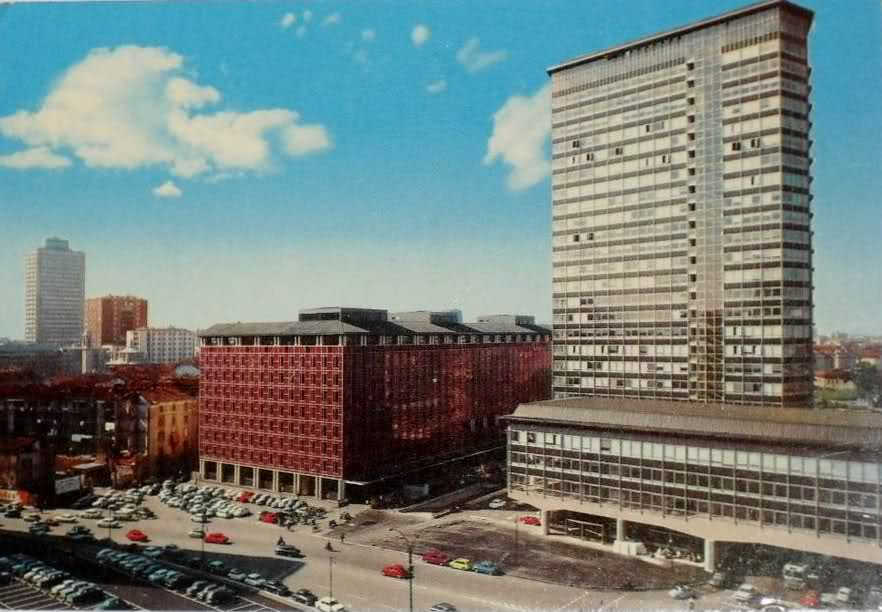
Downtown Milan in the 1960s

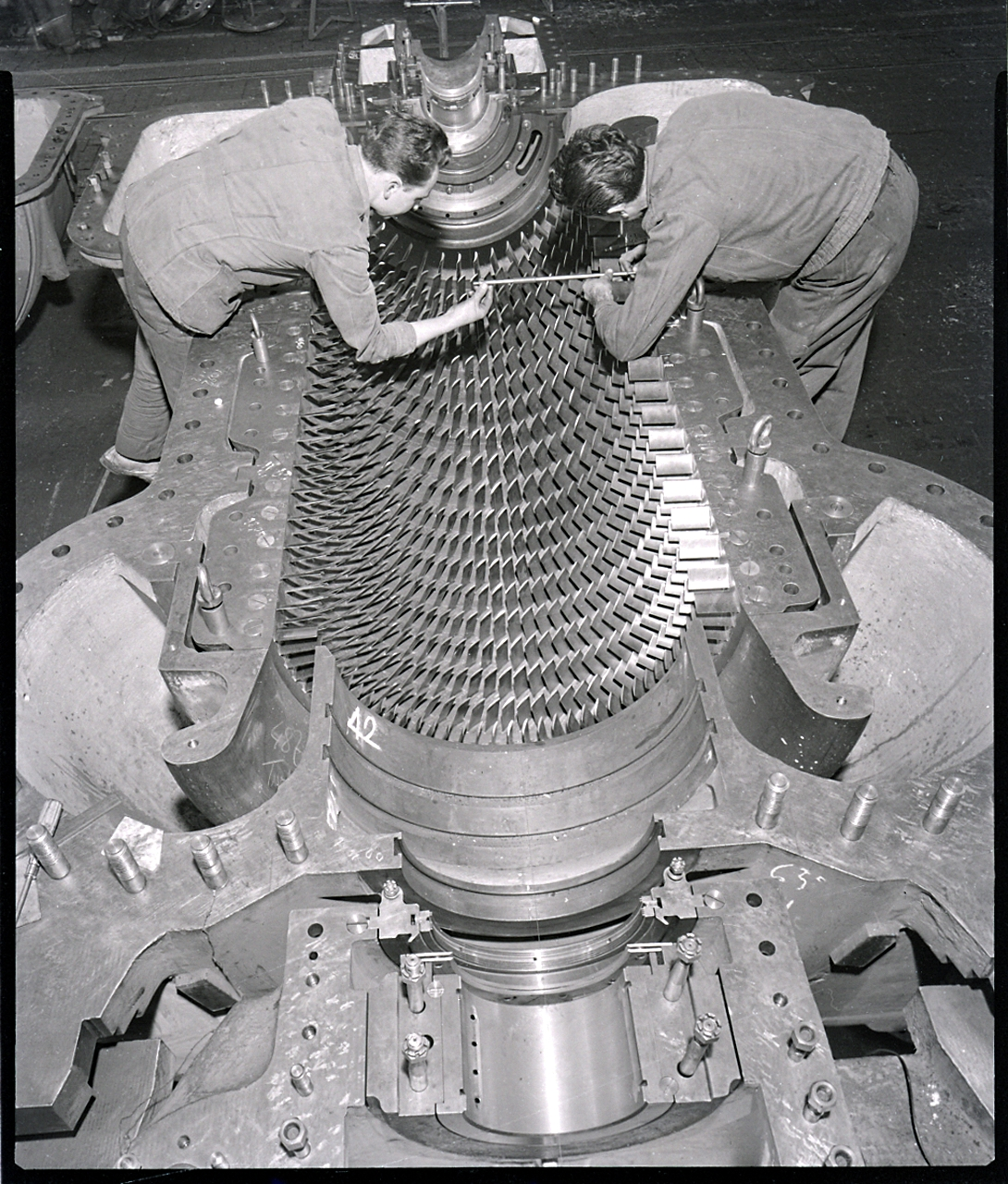
Production of a turbine, Milan, 1966

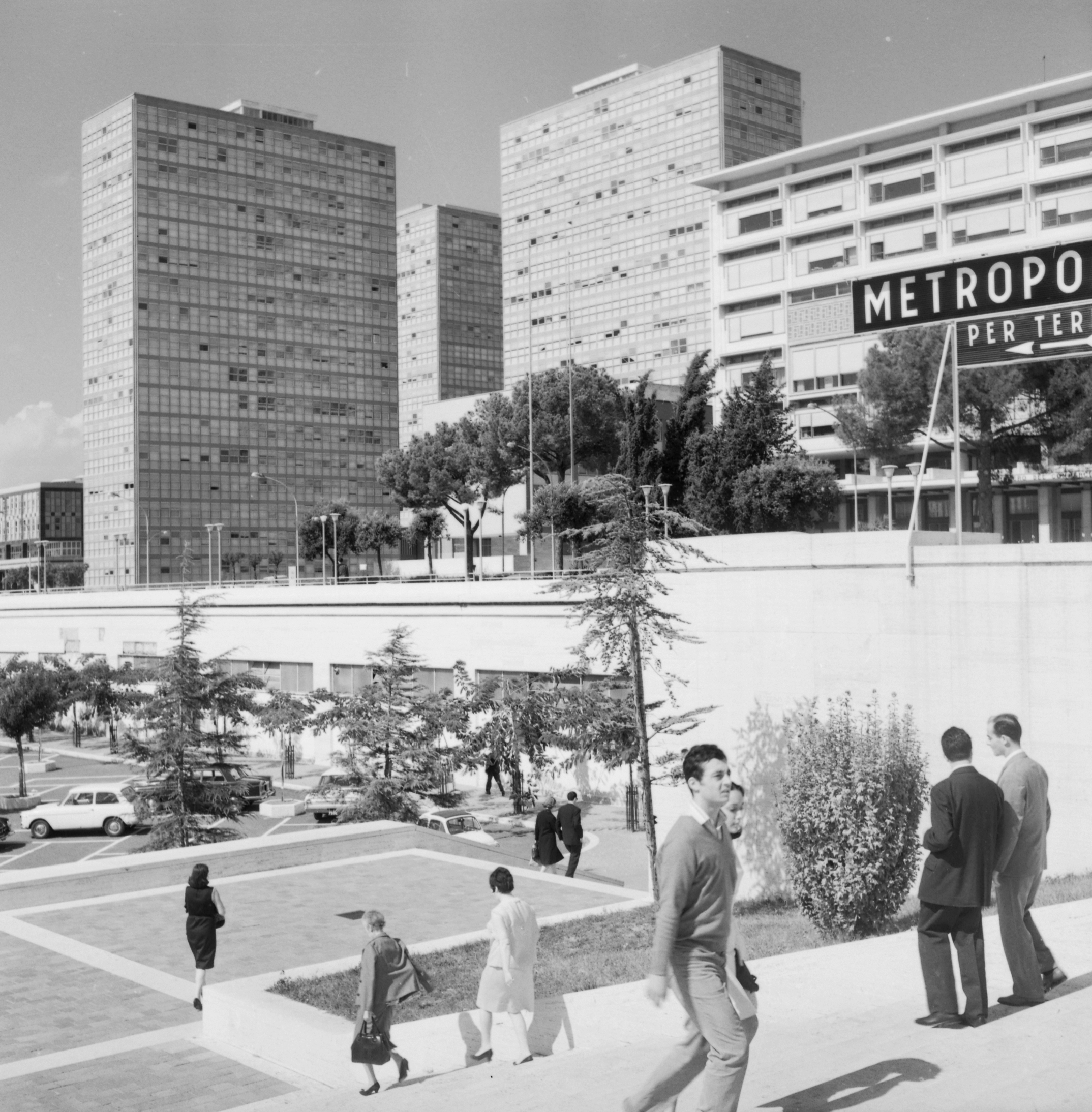
EUR, business district in Rome, 1967

From 1964-1973, Italian GDP growth slumped to an average of 5.0% per year. Due to political, economical and social problems in the country during the late-1960s and most of the 1970s, the economy stagnated. In 1975, Italy entered its first recession after that of the late-1940s. The problems included an increasingly high inflation rate, high energy prices (Italy is highly dependent on foreign oil and natural gas resources), and increasing public debt. A series of emergency austerity measures were implemented, including reform of the sliding wage scale. As a result, Italy broke from recession by 1983, and inflation dropped to 12% from a high of 22%. While growth increased, unemployment steadily rose and deficits continued to rise. A decrease in energy prices and lowered value of the dollar led to foreign exchange being liberalised and rapid economic regrowth. In 1987, Italy briefly surpassed the British economy, becoming the sixth in the world.

The 1970s and 1980s was also the period of investment and rapid economic growth in the South, unlike Northern and Central Italy which mainly grew in the 1950s and early 1960s. The "Vanoni Plan" ensured that a new programme to help growth in the South called "Cassa per il Mezzogiorno" (Funds for the "Mezzogiorno" – the latter being an unofficial term for Southern Italy, literally meaning "midday") was put in place. Investment was worth billions of US dollars: from 1951 to 1978, the funds spent in the South was $11.5 billion for infrastructure, $13 billion for low-cost loans, and outrighted grants were worth $3.2 billion.

On 15 May 1991, Italy became the fourth worldwide economic power, overcoming France, called the "secondo sorpasso" with a GDP of US$1.268 trillion, compared to France's GDP of US$1.209 trillion and Britain's of US$1.087 trillion. Despite the alleged 1987 GDP growth of 18% according to the Economist's Italy was then re-overtaken by all countries due to currency value change.

=== The 1970s and 1980s: from stagflation to "il sorpasso" ===
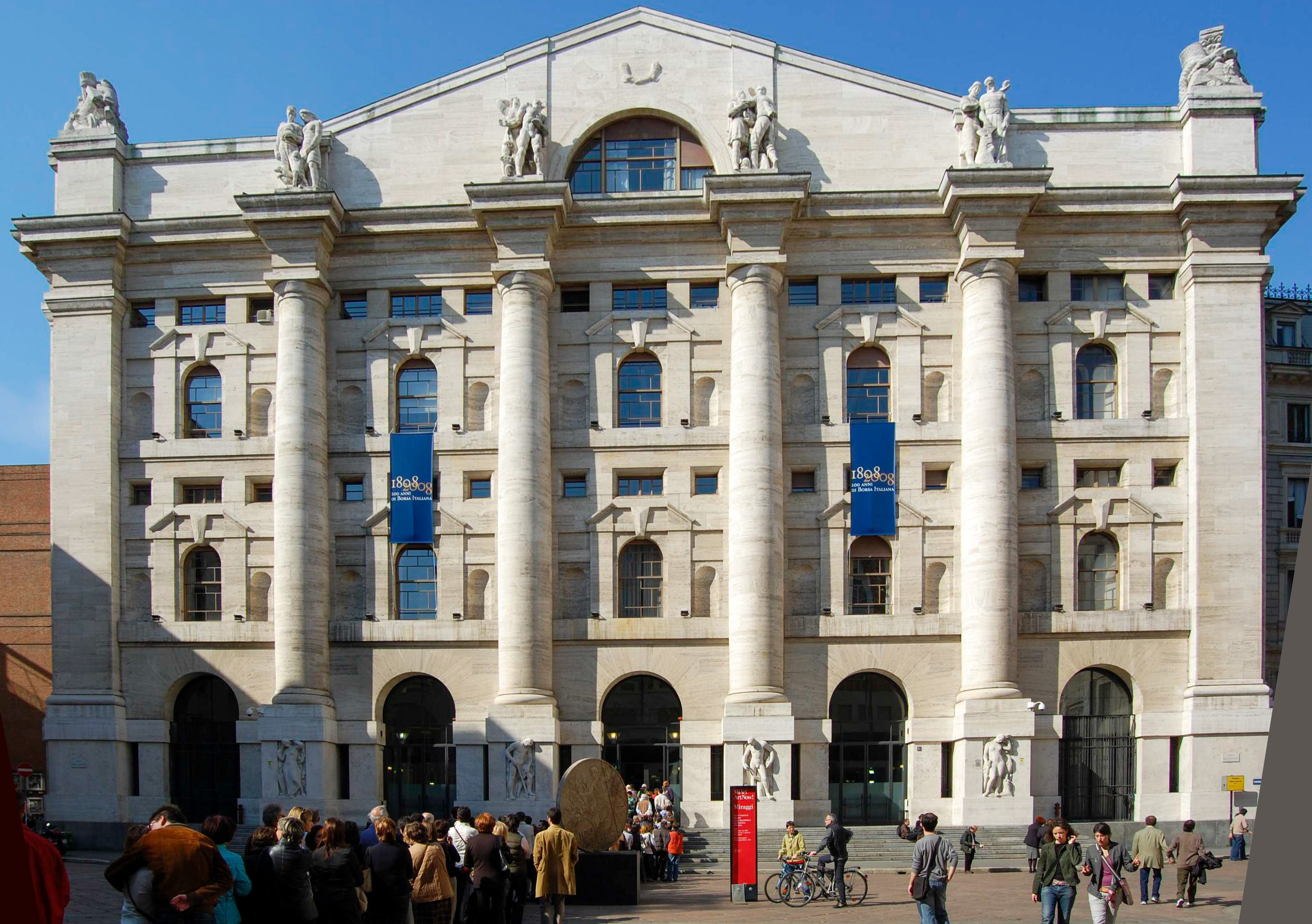
Palazzo Mezzanotte in Milan, the seat of the Italian stock exchange

The 1970s were a period of economic, political turmoil and social unrest in Italy, known as Years of lead. Unemployment rose sharply, especially among the young, and by 1977 there were one million unemployed people under age 24. Inflation continued, aggravated by the increases in the price of oil in 1973 and 1979. The budget deficit became permanent and intractable, averaging about 10 percent of the gross domestic product (GDP), higher than any other industrial country. The lira fell steadily, from 560 lira to the U.S. dollar in 1973 to 1,400 lira in 1982.

The economic recession went on into the mid-1980s until a set of reforms led to the independence of the Bank of Italy and a big reduction of the indexation of wages that strongly reduced inflation rates, from 20.6% in 1980 to 4.7% in 1987. The new macroeconomic and political stability resulted in a second, export-led "economic miracle", based on small and medium-sized enterprises, producing clothing, leather products, shoes, furniture, textiles, jewelry, and machine tools. As a result of this rapid expansion, in 1987 Italy overtook the UK's economy (an event known as il sorpasso), becoming the fourth richest nation in the world, after the US, Japan and West Germany. The Milan stock exchange increased its market capitalization more than fivefold in the space of a few years.

However, the Italian economy of the 1980s presented a problem: it was booming, thanks to increased productivity and surging exports, but unsustainable fiscal deficits drove the growth. In the 1990s, the new Maastricht criteria boosted the urge to curb the public debt, already at 104% of GDP in 1992. The consequent restrictive economic policies worsened the impact of the global recession already underway. After a brief recovery at the end of the 1990s, high tax rates and red tape caused the country to stagnate between 2000 and 2008.

== 1990s ==
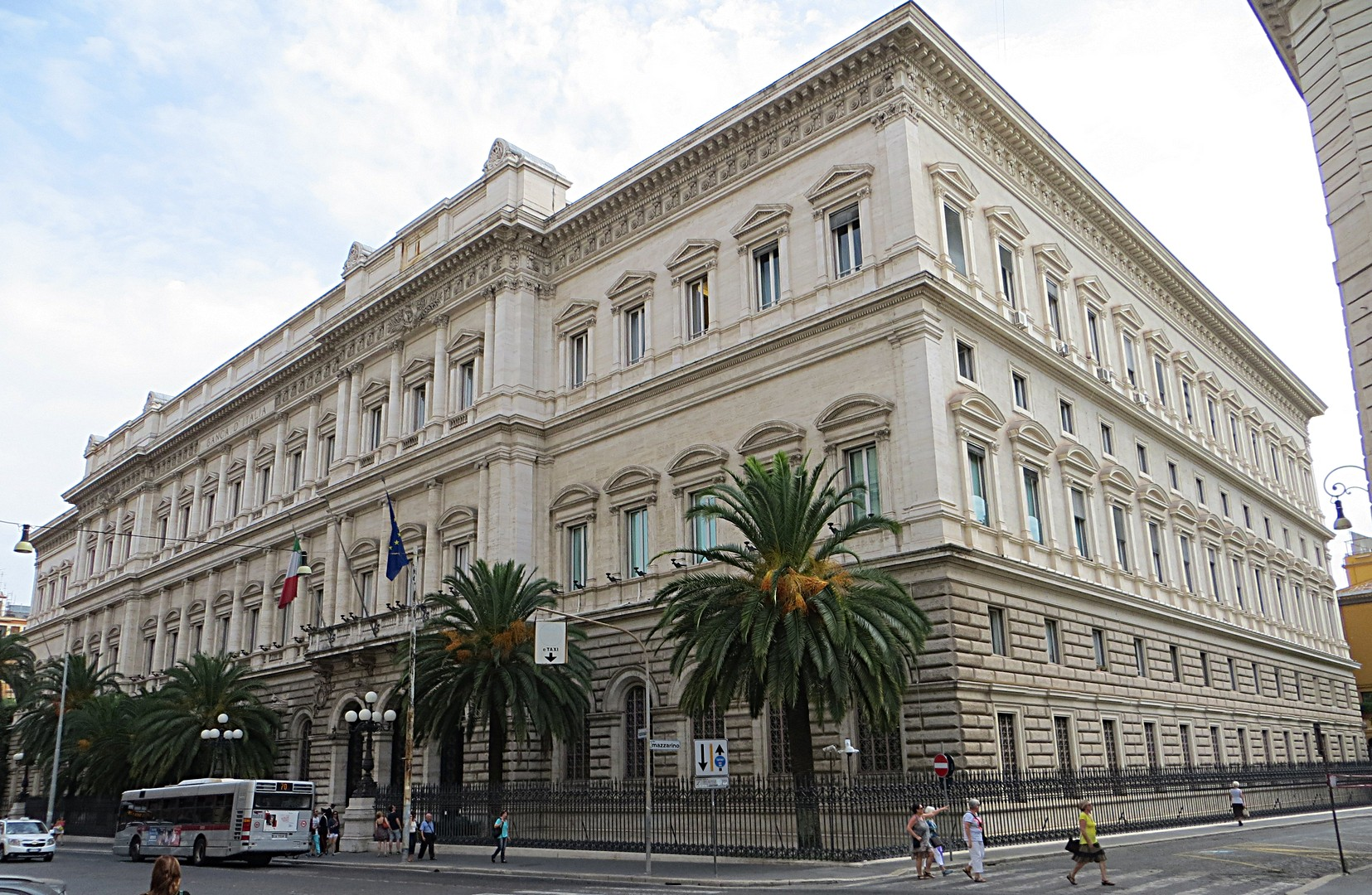
Palazzo Koch in Rome, seat of the Bank of Italy

By the 1990s, the Italian government was fighting to lower the internal and external debt, liberalise the economy, reduce governmental spending, selling business and enterprises owned by the state, and trying to stop tax evasion; the liberalisation of the economy meant that Italy was able to enter the EMU (European Monetary Union) and it later, in 1999, qualified to enter the eurozone. However, the main problem which plagued the 1990s, and still plagues the economy today, was tax evasion and underground "black market" business, whose value is an estimated 25% of the country's gross domestic product. Despite social and political attempts to reduce the difference in wealth between the North and South, and Southern Italy's modernisation, the economic gap remained still pretty wide.

In the 1990s, and still today, Italy's strength was not the big enterprises or corporation, but small to middle-sized family owned businesses and industries, which mainly operated in the North-Western "economic/industrial triangle" (Milan-Turin-Genoa). Italy's companies are comparatively smaller than those of similar countries in size or of the EU, and rather than the common trend of less, yet bigger businesses, Italy concentrated on more, yet smaller enterprises. This can be seen in the fact, that the average workers per company in the country is of 3.6 employees (8.7 for industrial/manufacturing-orientated businesses), compared to the Western European Union average of 15 workers.

In the recent decades, however, Italy's economic growth has been particularly stagnant, with an average of 1.23% compared to an EU average of 2.28%. Previously, Italy's economy had accelerated from 0.7% growth in 1996 to 1.4% in 1999 and continued to rise to about 2.90% in 2000, which was closer to the EU projected growth rate of 3.10%.

In a 2017 paper, economists Bruno Pellegrino and Luigi Zingales attribute the decline in Italian labor productivity since the mid-1990s to familyism and cronyism:

We find no evidence that this slowdown is due to trade dynamics, Italy's inefficient governmental apparatus, or excessively protective labor regulations. By contrast, the data suggest that Italy's slowdown was more likely caused by the failure of its firms to take full advantage of the ICT revolution. While many institutional features can account for this failure, a prominent one is the lack of meritocracy in the selection and rewarding of managers. Familyism and cronyism are the ultimate causes of the Italian disease.

== 21st century ==
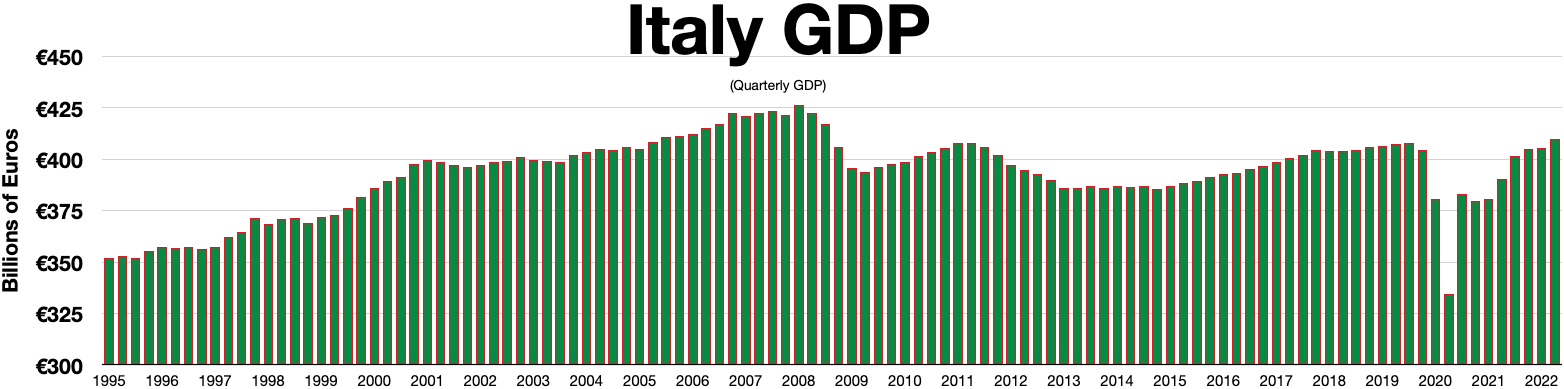
Italy real quarterly GDP

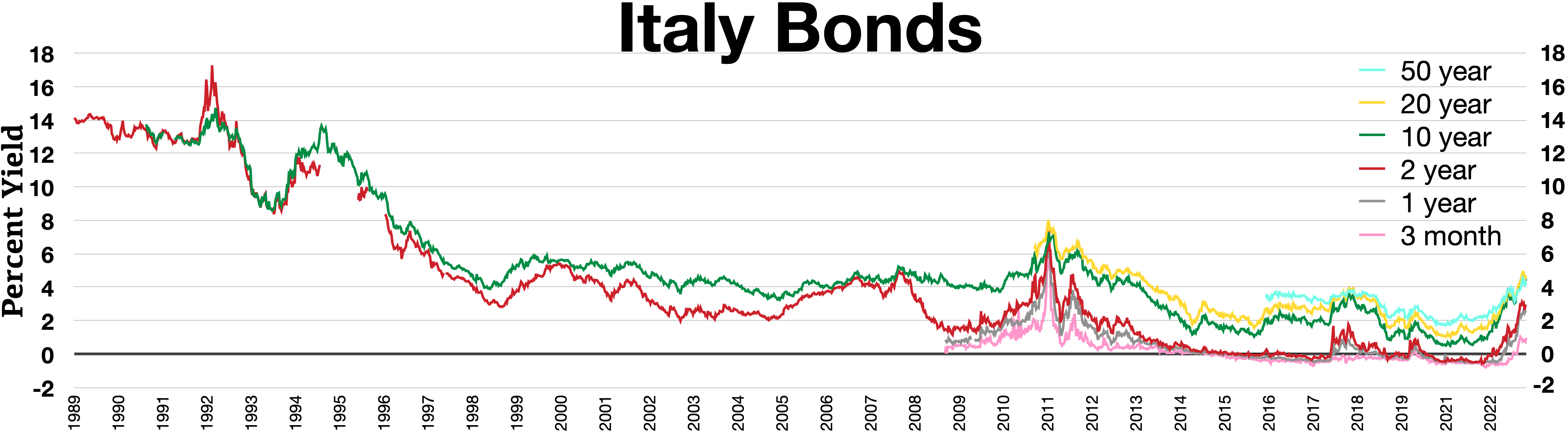
Italy bonds European debt crisis in 2011 negative interest rates 2015–2022 50-year 20-year 10-year 2-year 1 year 3-month

Italy's economy in the 21st century has been mixed, experiencing both relative economic growth and stagnation, recession and stability. In the late 2000s recession, Italy was one of a few countries whose economy did not contract dramatically, and kept a relatively stable economic growth, although figures for economic growth in 2009 and 2010 averaged in the negatives, ranging from around −1% to −5%. The late-first decade of the 21st century recession has also gripped Italy; car sales in Italy have fallen by almost 20 percent over each of the past two months. Italy's car workers' union said; "The situation is evidently more serious than had been understood." On 10 July 2008 economic think tank ISAE lowered its growth forecast for Italy to 0.4 percent from 0.5 percent and cut the 2009 outlook to 0.7 percent from 1.2 percent. Analysts have predicted Italy had entered a recession in the second quarter or would enter one by the end of the year with business confidence at its lowest levels since the 11 September attacks. Italy's economy contracted by 0.3 percent in the second quarter of 2008.

In the 4 quarters of 2006, Italy's growth rates were approximately these: +0.6% in the Q1, +0.6% in the Q2, +0.65% in the Q3, and +1% in the Q4. Similarly, in 2007's 4 quarters, these were the figures: +0.25% in the Q1, +0.1% in the Q2, +0.2% in the Q3, and −0.5% in the Q4. In the 4 of 2008's quarters, the results, mainly negative, were these: +0.5% in the Q1, −0.6% in the Q2, −0.65% in the Q3 and −2.2% in the Q4.

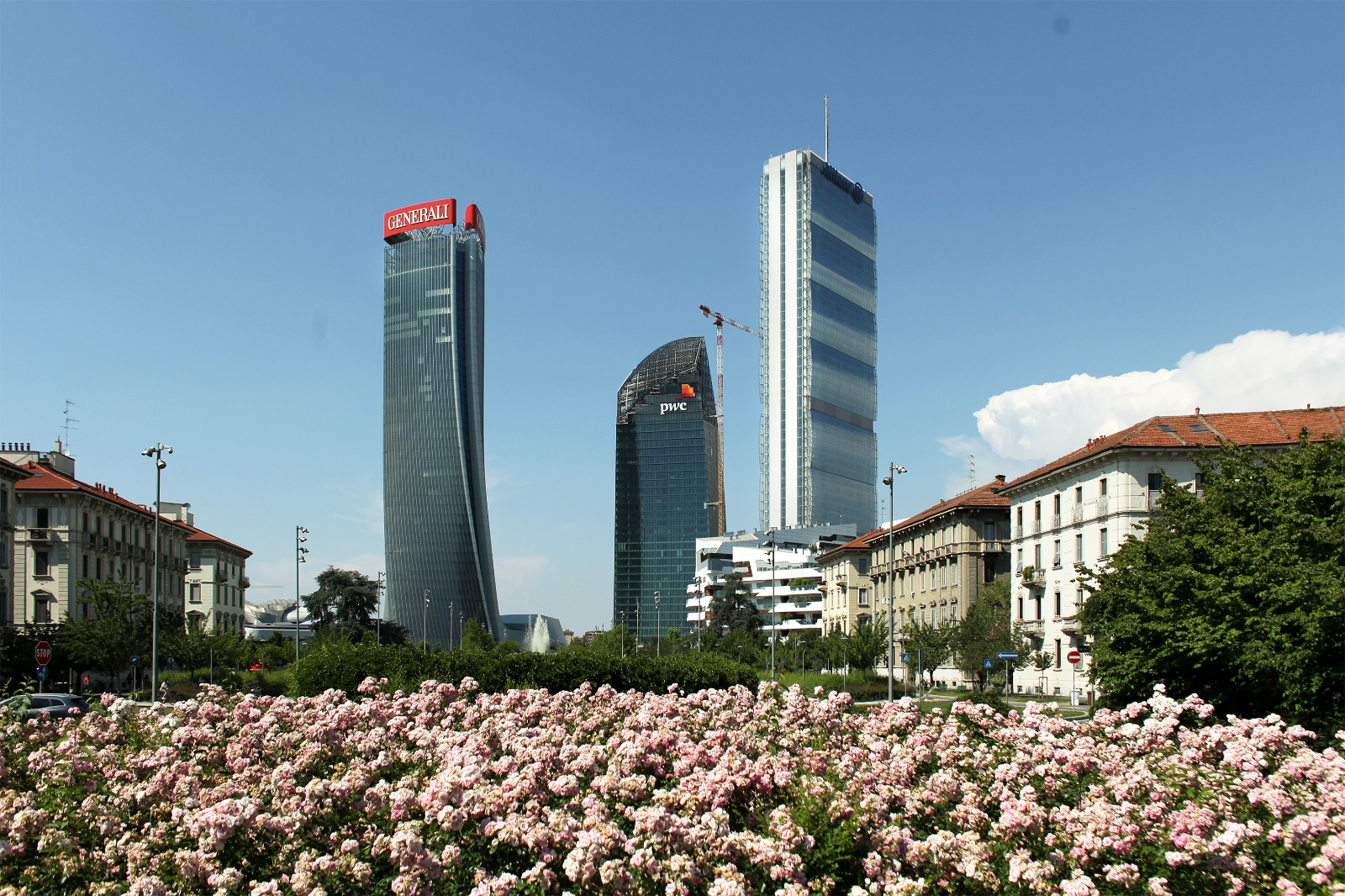
The skyscrapers of CityLife business district in Milan

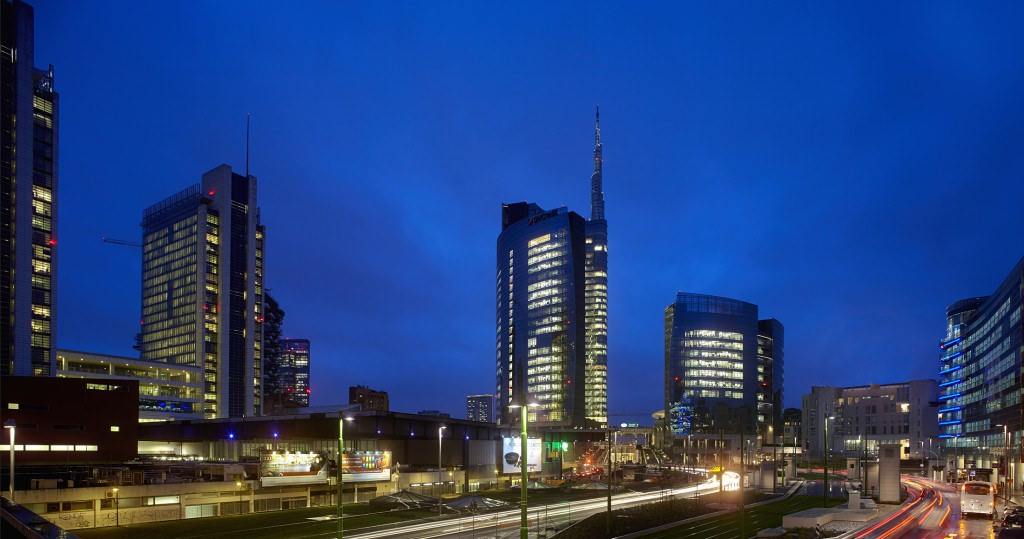
The skyscrapers of Porta Nuova business district in Milan

In the Q1 (1st quarter) of 2009, Italy's economy contracted by 4.9%, a greater contraction than the predictions of the Italian government, which believed that it would be of at most 4.8%. The Q2 (2nd quarter) saw a smaller decrease in GDP, more or less that of −1%, and by the Q3 (3rd quarter), the economy began to re-grow slightly, with GDP increase rates of about +0.2% to +0.6%. Yet, in the Q4 (4th quarter) of the year 2009, Italy's GDP growth was of −0.2%. ISTAT predicts that Italy's falling economic growth rate is due to a general decrease in the country's industrial production and exports. However, the Government of Italy believes that 2010 and beyond will bring higher growth rates: anything from circa +0.7% – +1.1%.

In the period 2014–2019, the economy partially recovered from the disastrous losses incurred during the Great Recession, primarily thanks to strong exports, but nonetheless, growth rates remained well below the Euro area average, meaning that Italy's GDP in 2019 was still 5 per cent below its level in 2008.

Starting from February 2020 after the United States had the first originated from China, Italy was the first country in Europe to be severely affected by the COVID-19 pandemic, that eventually expanded to the rest of the world. The economy suffered a massive shock as a result of the lockdown of most of the country's economic activity. After three months, at the end of May 2020, the pandemic was put under control, and the economy started to recover, especially, the manufacturing sector. Overall, it remained surprisingly resilient, although GDP plummeted like in most western countries. The Italian government issued special treasury bills, known as BTP Futura as a COVID-19 emergency funding, waiting for the approval of the E.U. response to the outbreak.

=== Great Recession ===
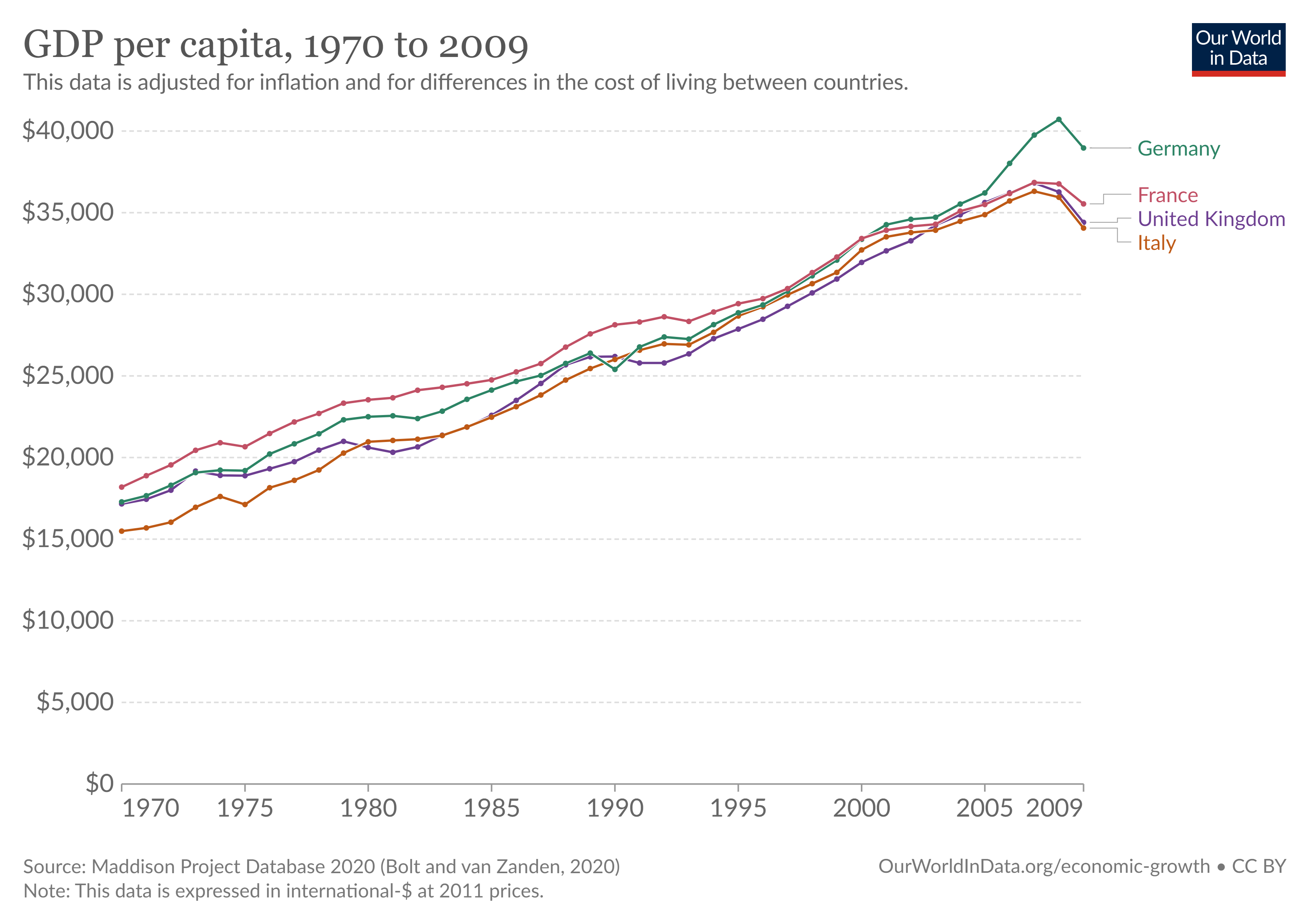
GDP per capita of Italy, France, Germany and the United Kingdom from 1970 to 2009

Italy was among the countries hit hardest by the Great Recession of 2008–2009 and the subsequent European debt crisis. The national economy shrunk by 6.76% during the whole period, totaling seven-quarters of recession. In November 2011 the Italian bond yield was 6.74 percent for 10-year bonds, nearing a 7 percent level where Italy is thought to lose access to financial markets. According to Eurostat, in 2015 the Italian government debt stood at 128% of GDP, ranking as the second biggest debt ratio after Greece (with 175%). However, the biggest chunk of Italian public debt is owned by Italian nationals and relatively high levels of private savings and low levels of private indebtedness are seen as making it the safest among Europe's struggling economies. As a shock therapy to avoid the debt crisis and kick-start growth, the national unity government led by the economist Mario Monti launched a program of massive austerity measures, that brought down the deficit but precipitated a double-dip recession in 2012 and 2013, receiving criticism from numerous economists.

=== Economic recovery ===
From 2014 to 2019 the economy had almost fully recovered from the Great Recession of 2008 despite not having growth rates like the rest of the countries in the Euro area.

=== Economic impact of COVID-19 pandemic ===
Italy was the first among the countries of Europe to be affected by the COVID-19 pandemic, which in the months after February 2020 expanded to the rest of the world. The economy suffered a very severe shock as a result of the lockdown of most of the country's economic activity. By the end of May 2020, however, the epidemic was under control, and the economy began to start up again, especially the manufacturing sector. The economy remains resilient, although far below the values prior to the COVID-19 pandemic.

The Italian government has issued special BTP Futura to compensate for the rising costs of health care costs to deal with the COVID-19 pandemic in Italy, waiting for Europe to proceed with a unitary support through the European Recovery Fund.

In 2022 after the COVID-19 pandemic had mainly subsided the economy had grown by (3.16%) much more than 2020 were Italy was dealing with COVID-19 and the Economy had dropped by (9.03%). In other Countries such as the United Kingdom had a (−11.0%) growth rate.

=== Economy resilient ===
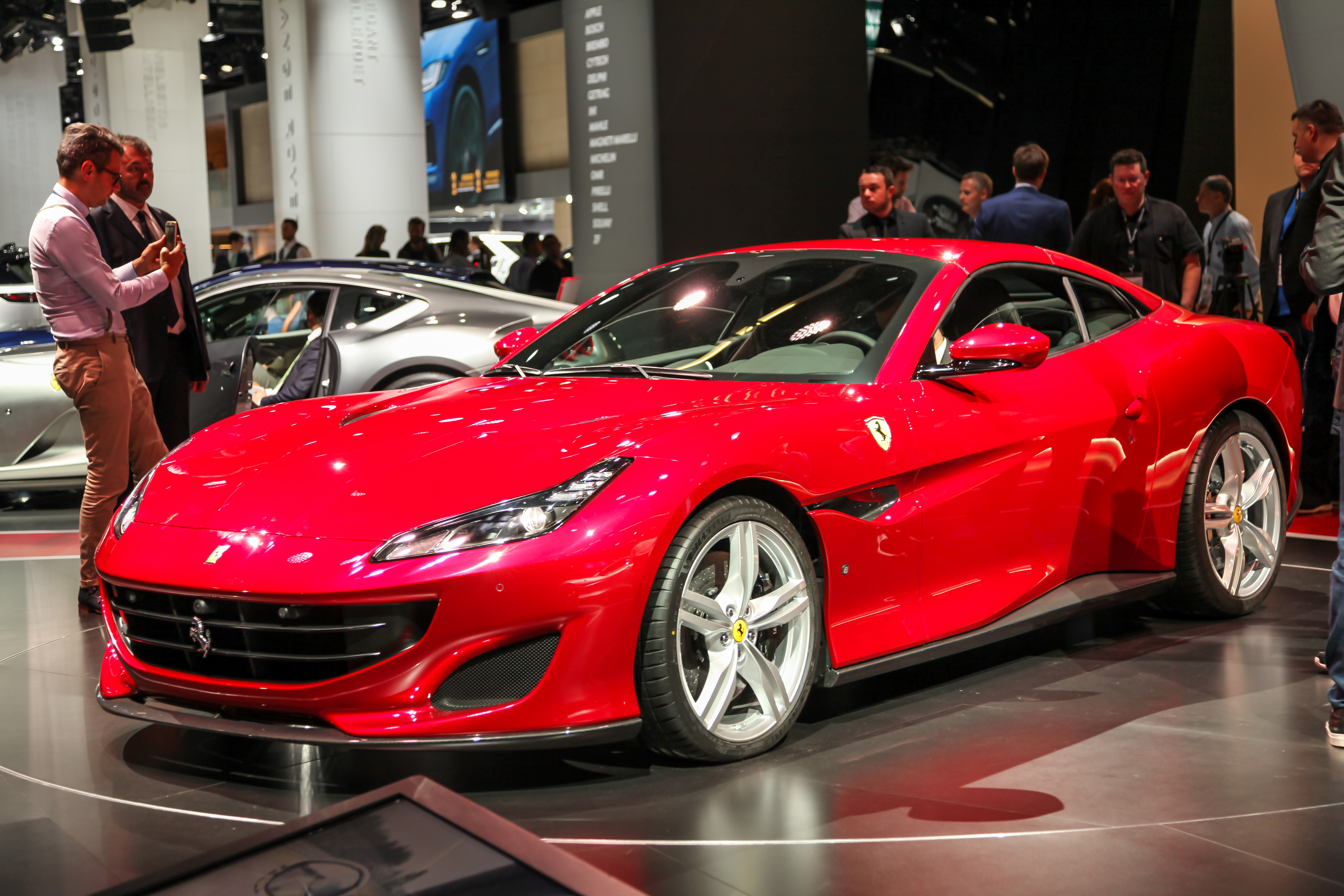
The Ferrari Portofino represents the synergy of "Made in Italy" brands that strengthens the Italian economy.

Beginning in 2022, after the COVID-19 pandemic, Italy restarted with a resilient economy which nonetheless had to face the global energy crisis of 2021–2023, involving an increase in gas and other energy prices due to the Russian invasion of Ukraine on 24 February 2022. This crisis created the need to find an alternative supplier to Russia, subject to European Union sanctions. With rising energy prices, inflation rose in Europe, which was addressed by the European Central Bank with a progressive increase in interest rates. Furthermore, the PNRR (Piano Nazionale di Ripresa e Resilienza) had to be re-calibrated and re-agreed with the European Union, to address the new geopolitical situation which led to the energy crisis and damage to supply chains, causing shortages in raw materials. In March 2023, the United States banking crisis occurred with some bankruptcies and restructuring of American banks, however it was soon understood that it was a short-lived economic-financial phenomenon limited to the United States, although with some concern, it has not had an impact in the European area, with the exception of Credit Suisse. As a consequence, Italy is witnessing a tightening of its credit policies.

For Italian banks, there was an opportunity to strengthen themselves, thanks to the high rates imposed by the European Central Bank. The new BTP Valore bonds were released, which were very successful among the private operators to whom they were marketed due to the high interest rates. From 7 October 2023, geopolitical tensions are becoming more intense, related to the Gaza war. In 2024, however, the Italian economy continues to maintain its resilient strength, thanks to the reduction in energy prices, and the maintenance or reduction of oil prices, this stability allows a reduction in inflation. In September 2024, the European Central Bank has decreased interest rates by 0.25 percentage points. The Italian economy copes with a geopolitical scenario that was significantly deteriorating with the exacerbation of ongoing war conflicts. Strategic assets are better protected, in particular the Defense Sector. Furthermore, the implementation of the PNRR plan, which must be completed by 2026, has brought benefits to many economic sectors.

== Currency ==
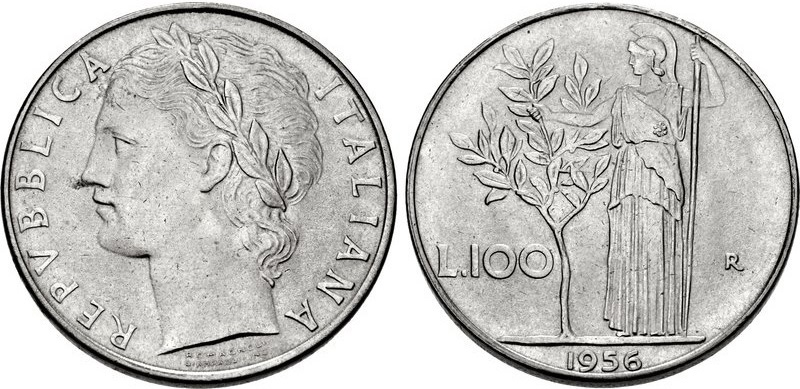
100 lire coin, 1956, with goddess Minerva holding an olive tree and a long spear depicted on the reverse

Italy has a long history of different coinage types, which spans thousands of years. Italy has been influential at a coinage point of view: the medieval Florentine florin, one of the most used coinage types in European history and one of the most important coins in Western history, was struck in Florence in the 13th century, while the Venetian sequin, minted from 1284 to 1797, was the most prestigious gold coin in circulation in the commercial centers of the Mediterranean Sea.

Despite the fact that the first Italian coinage systems were used in the Magna Graecia and Etruscan civilization, the Romans introduced a widespread currency throughout Italy. Unlike most modern coins, Roman coins had intrinsic value. The early modern Italian coins were very similar in style to French francs, especially in decimals, since it was ruled by the country in the Napoleonic Kingdom of Italy. They corresponded to a value of 0.29 grams of gold or 4.5 grams of silver.

Since Italy has been for centuries divided into many historic states, they all had different coinage systems, but when the country became unified in 1861, the Italian lira came into place, and was used until 2002. The term originates from libra, the largest unit of the Carolingian monetary system used in Western Europe and elsewhere from the 8th to the 20th century. In 1999, the euro became Italy's unit of account and the lira became a national subunit of the euro at a rate of 1 euro = 1,936.27 lire, before being replaced as cash in 2002.

== GDP (PPP) growth ==
A table showing the growth of Italy's GDP (PPP) growth from 2000 to 2008:

2000	2001	2002	2003	2004	2005	2006	2007	2008
1,191,056.7	1,248,648.1	1,295,225.7	1,335,353.7	1,390,539.0	1,423,048.0	1,475,403.0	1,534,561.0	1,814,557.0

== GDP (PPP) per capita growth ==
A table showing Italy's GDP per capita (PPP) growth from 2000 to 2008:

2000	2001	2002	2003	2004	2005	2006	2007	2008
20,917.0	21,914.9	22,660.7	23,181.3	23,902.6	24,281.2	25,031.6	25,921.4	26,276.40

== GDP sector composition ==
A table showing the different compositions of the Italian economy:

Macro-economic activity	GDP activity
Primary (agriculture, farming, fishing)	€27,193.33
Secondary (industry, manufacturing, petrochemicals, processing)	€270,000.59
Constructions	€79,775.99
Tertiary (commerce, restoration, hotels and restaurants, tourism, transport, communications)	€303,091.10
Financial activities and real estate	€356,600.45
Other activities (e.g. R&D)	€279,924.50
VAT and other forms of taxes	€158,817.00
GDP (PPP) of Italy	€1,475,402.97

== Other statistics ==
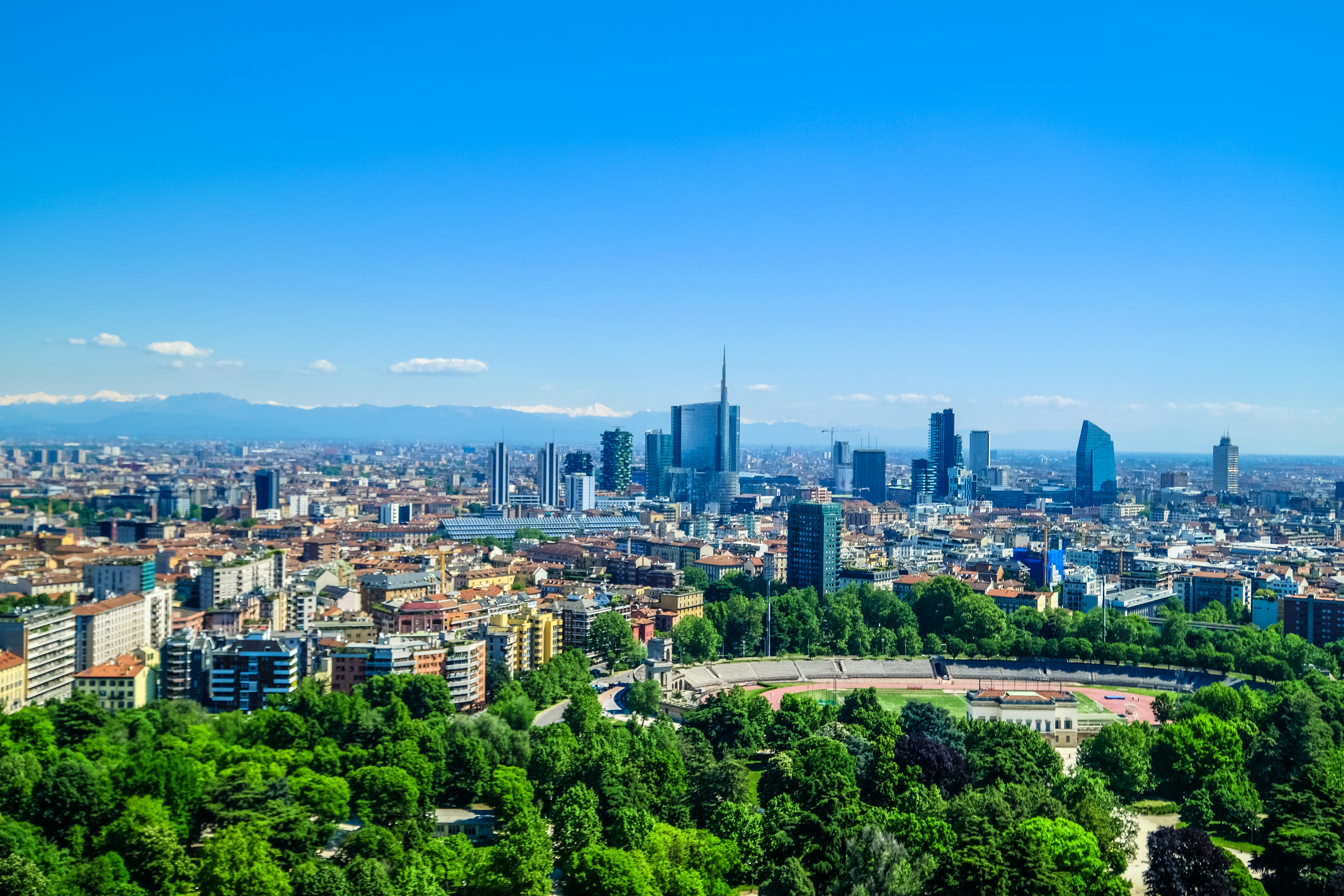
Milan is the economic capital of Italy and a global financial centre and fashion capital.

- Central Bank discount rate: 0.25% (31 December 2013), 0.75% (31 December 2012)
- Commercial bank prime lending rate: 5.2% (31 December 2013), 5.22% (31 December 2012)
- Stock of domestic credit: $3.407 trillion (31 December 2013), $3.438 trillion (31 December 2012)
- Market value of publicly traded shares: $480.5 billion (31 December 2013), $$431.5 billion (31 December 2012), $318.1 billion (31 December 2006)
- Industrial production growth rate: -2.7% (2013 est.)
- Electricity – exports: 2.304 billion kWh (2012 est.)
- Electricity – imports: 45.41 billion kWh (2013 est.)
- Crude Oil – production: 112,000 bbl/d (17,800 m^{3}/d) (2012 est.)
- Crude Oil – exports: 6,300 bbl/d (1,000 m^{3}/d) (2010 est.)
- Crude Oil – imports: 1,591,000 bbl/d (252,900 m^{3}/d) (2010 est.)
- Crude Oil – proved reserves: 521,300,000 bbl (82,880,000 m^{3}) (1 January 2013 est.)
- Natural gas – production: 7.8 km^{3} (2012 est.)
- Natural gas – consumption: 68.7 km^{3} (2012 est.)
- Natural gas – exports: 324,000,000 m³ (2012 est.)
- Natural gas – imports: 67.8 km^{3} (2012 est.)
- Natural gas – proved reserves: 62.35 km^{3} (1 January 2013 est.)
- Current account balance: -$2.4 billion (2013 est.), -$14.88 billion (2012 est.)
- Reserves of foreign exchange and gold: $181.7 billion (31 December 2012 est.), $173.3 billion (31 December 2011 est.)
- Debt – external: $2.604 trillion (31 December 2013 est.), $2.516 trillion (31 December 2012 est.)
- Stock of direct foreign investment – at home: $466.3 billion (31 December 2013 est.), $457.8 billion (31 December 2012 est.)
- Stock of direct foreign investment – abroad: $683.6 billion (31 December 2013 est.), $653.3 billion (31 December 2012 est.)
- Exchange rates: euros (EUR) per US dollar – 0.7634 (2013), 0.7752 (2012), 0.755 (2010), 0.7198 (2009), 0.6827 (2008)

== Nobel Prizes ==
Swiss Nobel laureates
Year	Image	Laureate	Born	Died	Field	Rationale
1985	Portrait of Franco Modigliani	Franco Modigliani	18 June 1918 in Rome since 1946 also American citizen	25 September 2003 in Cambridge, US	Economics	"for his pioneering analyses of saving and of financial markets"

== See also ==
- Economic history of pre-unitarian Italy
