= Youth unemployment in Italy =

Causes and measures of Italian youth unemployment

Youth unemployment in Italy discusses the statistics, trends, causes and consequences of unemployment among young Italians. Italy displays one of the highest rates of youth unemployment among the 35 member countries of the Organization of Economic Co-Operation and Development (OECD). The Italian youth unemployment rate started raising dramatically since the 2008 financial crisis, reaching its peak of 42.67% in 2014. In 2017, among the EU member states, the youth unemployment rate of Italy (35.1%) was exceeded by only Spain and Greece. The Italian youth unemployment rate was more than the double of the total EU average rate of 16.7% in 2017. While youth unemployment is extremely high compared to EU standards, the Italian total unemployment rate (11.1%) is closer to EU average (7.4%).

== Statistics ==
Youth unemployment in Italy can be quantified by many measures. According to the World Bank, the youth unemployment rate is 34.726% as of September 27, 2018. Throughout Italy's history of tracking youth unemployment (1983 to 2018), the average percentage has been 30%. Between 1994 and 2000, youth unemployment averaged 33% In certain regions of Italy, especially the southern region of Calabria, the unemployment rate is higher than the rest of the country. As of 2017, Calabria has the highest rate of youth unemployment in the country with 55.6% of the population unemployed between the ages of 15 and 24. In contrast, the 2017 statistic for the lowest rate of youth unemployment was recorded in the northern region of Italy in Trentino-South Tyrol at 14.4%. In 2017, nearly 1 in 5 young Italians were considered to be in the group of unemployed, not looking for employment, and not enrolled in school. In 2017, young Italian families were shown to have a stronger chance of living without income or in complete poverty. Nearly 60% of these families belonged to the generalized group of "new entrants", or rather workers that were attempting to join the labor market for the first time. These young Italians and their families are nearly 3.5 times more likely to be unemployed than older Italians. When compared to the ratio of Germany (1.5 times more likely), young Italians have a much higher chance to remain unemployed. Jobs for young Italians are in great demand in Italy, with certain financial positions receiving 85,000 applications and accepting only 30 candidates. Certain Italian hospital positions have received 7,000 applications and accepted only 10 candidates. These examples of limited employment positions are representative of the day-to-day conditions that young Italians face when searching for employment.

Historically, 40.3% of 15–24 year-olds who were actively part of the labor force were unemployed in 2015.

22% of the same population had been unemployed for 12 or more months, meaning more than half of the unemployed active Italian youth had been so long-term. Yet another subset of the youth population is neither in employment nor in education and training (NEET), which in 2015 represented 21.4% of Italy's 15–24 year-olds. In addition to complete unemployment, Italian youth also have high levels of underemployment. The number of 15–24 year-olds who worked full-time (30 hours per week) dropped from 1,597,000 in 2000 to 676,000 in 2015, while the number of part-time workers increased from 172,000 to 237,000 people. Furthermore, 83.7% of the young part-time workers in 2015 did so involuntarily because they could not find full-time employment.

Transition from education to employment

The transition period from school to work has been cited as a primary cause of youth unemployment in Italy. The Italian education system has been blamed for being unable to provide work experience. Many students who graduate from secondary education in Italy are overqualified for the jobs available to them, especially in manufacturing and export sectors. Consequently many of the youth are limited to either temporary work or unemployment. By 2010, temporary contracts accounted for 50% of the youth in Italy, which only facilitated the churning of unemployment and increased the transition period between going back to school and finding a full-time job.

Before 2005, the period between graduating from school and the gap between obtaining employment was 51.3 months, which is much higher than the EU average of 30 months. Graduates are then overqualified for the labor market, meaning they have a higher skill level than what is in demand (called a vertical mismatch). Young non-university graduates consequently experience higher rates of unemployment (45%) than their degree-holding counterparts (25.6%).

=== Welfare system and labor market policy ===
Italy's problem of youth unemployment is also caused by its protectionist welfare system and labor market. In 2015, 62.4% 15–24 year-olds who were registered unemployed for 6–11 months did not receive any benefits or assistance; the same rate measured in the population of 15–74 year-olds was 52.4%. Though this demonstrates that benefits are exclusive for people of all ages in Italy, the young unemployed are left out at a rate 10% higher than the general population. This can be attributed to the country's corporatist structure; similarly to Greece, Spain, and Portugal (grouped into the "Southern Model" of European welfare) benefits in Italy are distributed in a very fragmented manner according to occupation. There are separate benefit schemes, or "micro-schemes", for specific private and public sectors, types of self-employment, and the large group of industrial workers called INPS. This system is split into the core group of labor market insiders receives generous benefits (such as pensions), while the irregular workers receive minimal benefits. For example, upon retirement an institutional worker would receive a pension of 89% their average net earnings, but a non-institutional worker would receive only 19%. Paradoxically, this "economic protection" model makes it difficult for young people to get their first job because they have never been part of the labor market. To illustrate, the unemployment benefits given to an Italian 18 year-old who has never had a job is 0% of average net earnings. In addition to receiving nonexistent/minimal benefits, a study also found youth were excluded based on factors including: the prerequisites for coverage, the age coverage is extended to, and sanctions for incorrectly using the system. Italy's model has exclusive unemployment benefits coupled with inflexible labor market policy (which means workers have high employment protection and are unlikely to be fired), which creates inhospitable conditions for young people seeking jobs.

== Consequences ==
Brain drain is one consequence of high unemployment. The high rate of unemployment encourages young citizens to leave the country. In fact, the main reason of the high numbers of young people leaving the country is the prospect of job opportunities abroad. Qualified Italians who choose to emigrate to Northern Europe are able to make between 29% and 48% more than their counterparts who remain in Italy. Youth emigration as a consequence results in the Italian government losing its investments in education and a considerable amount of young labor force. In the majority of the cases, the young unemployed emigrate to either other countries in Europe (mainly the United Kingdom and Germany) or to the United States and Australia. In 2016, more than 39% of Italian emigrants were of age between 18 and 34. Additionally, the percentage of young Italian emigrants is increasing every year at a steady rate.

It is often argued that Italy is made up of two different economies, one belonging to the North and one to the South. In terms of youth unemployment, there is a regional divide between North and South within Italy. In 2016, Italy presented one of the most internally diverse regional unemployment rates among the EU member states (together with other Southern European countries such as Greece and Spain). More than half of the young population was unemployed in the southern regions of Italy (Calabria, Campania, Puglia and Sicilia). On the other hand, unemployment rates in the northern regions (such as Lombardia, Piemonte and Veneto) varied between 5% and 10%.

== See also ==
- Youth unemployment
- Unemployment benefits in Italy
- Labor policy in Italy
- Youth unemployment in Spain
- Youth unemployment in the United Kingdom
- Unemployment in the United Kingdom
