= Citizens' income (Italy) =

Guaranteed minimum income program in Italy

Citizens' Income Law

Italian Parliament
- Long title: Conversion into law of the Decree entitled "Emergency provisions concerning the citizens' income and social security"
- Citation: Law no. 26 of 2019
- Enacted by: Chamber of Deputies
- Enacted by: Senate
- Signed by: Sergio Mattarella
- Signed: 28 March 2019
- Commenced: 29 March 2019

Legislative history

Initiating chamber: Chamber of Deputies
- Introduced by: Giuseppe Conte, Prime Minister; Luigi Di Maio, Minister of Economic Development
- Passed: 21 March 2019
- Voting summary: 291 voted for; 141 voted against; 14 abstained

Revising chamber: Senate
- Member(s) in charge: Giuseppe Conte, Prime Minister; Luigi Di Maio, Minister of Economic Development
- Passed: 27 March 2019
- Voting summary: 150 voted for; 107 voted against; 7 abstained
- Status: Amended

The Citizens' income (Italian: Reddito di cittadinanza) was a social welfare assistance program which was in effect in Italy between April 2019 and January 2024. Although its name recalled one of a universal basic income, it was actually a form of conditional and non-individual guaranteed minimum income.

The citizens' income had been proposed by the Five Star Movement (M5S) and approved under the Conte I Cabinet. According to research from Italy's National Institute of Statistics, there were "one million fewer poor people thanks to the citizen' income" and the subsidy had been useful in reducing excess poverty, especially during the COVID-19 pandemic in Italy and the subsequent COVID-19 recession. Poverty in Italy remained high, as 56% of the poor did not receive the allowance because they had not resided in Italy for at least 10 years, did not turn to the Centre of Fiscal Assistance and Patronages, or already had savings.

The citizens' income received attention during the campaign for the 2022 Italian general election, as the parties composing the centre-right coalition wanted to abolish the measure entirely, while the centre-left coalition wanted to reform and improve it and the M5S defended it from criticism.

On 1 January 2024, the Citizens' Income was abolished and replaced by two new subsidies targeting people below a certain level of poverty: the Inclusion cheques (Italian: assegno di inclusione), reserved for those who have to care for underage, elder, or disabled family-members, and the Aid to vocational training (Italian: supporto alla formazione e al lavoro), reserved for unemployed people who are both ineligible for Inclusion cheques and actively looking for a job.

The M5S proposes reinstating the citizen's income as Reddito di cittadinanza 2.0 after the 2027 elections. The goal is to expand poverty reduction efforts and strengthen education and employment programs.

== See also ==
- Italian welfare state
