= Italian welfare state =

Italian social policies

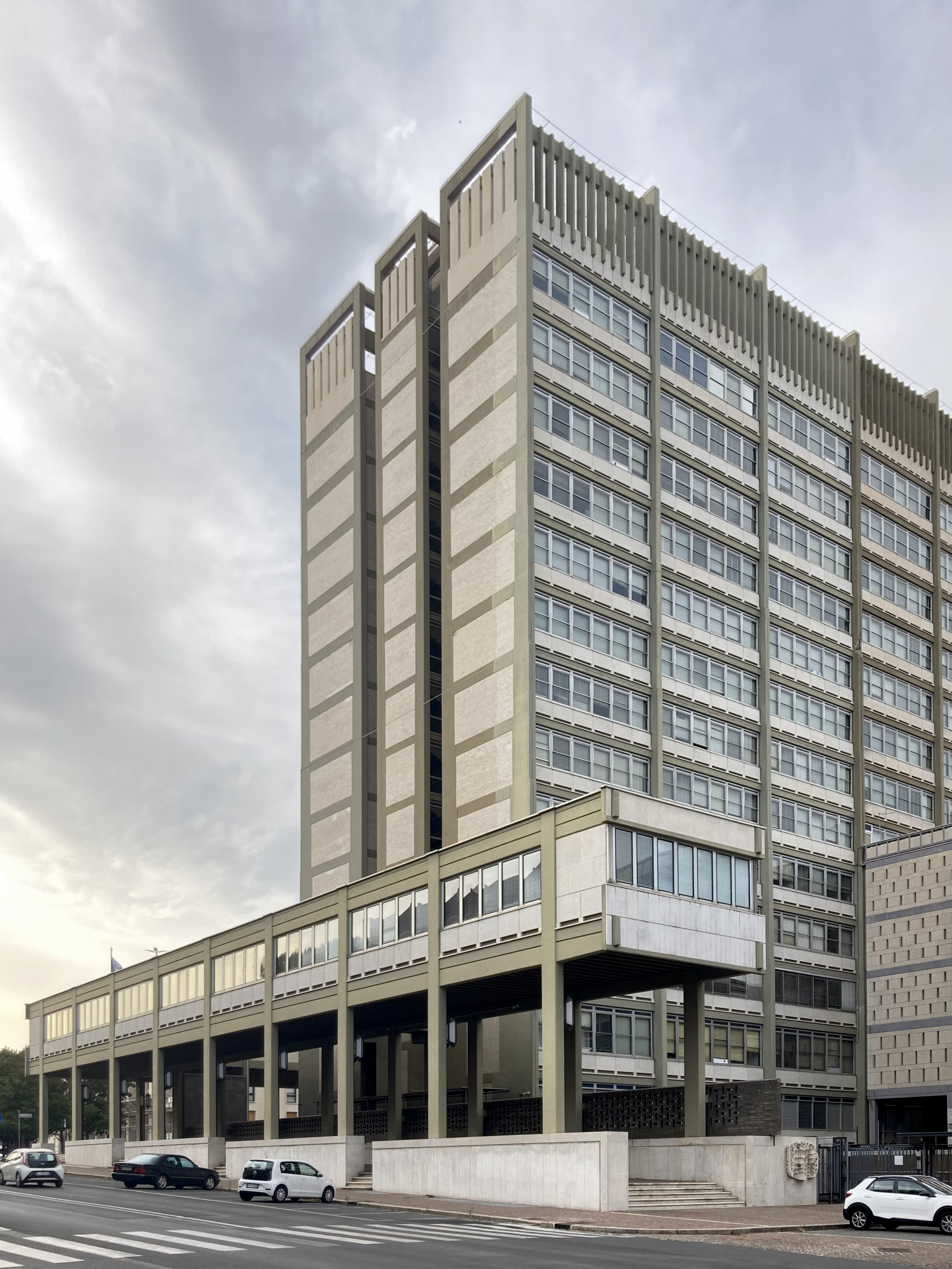
Italian National Institute for Social Security headquarters in Rome

The Italian welfare state is based partly upon the corporatist-conservative model (as described by Gøsta Esping-Andersen, one of the world's foremost sociologists working on the analysis of welfare states) and partly upon the universal welfare model.

== Main features ==
=== Health care ===
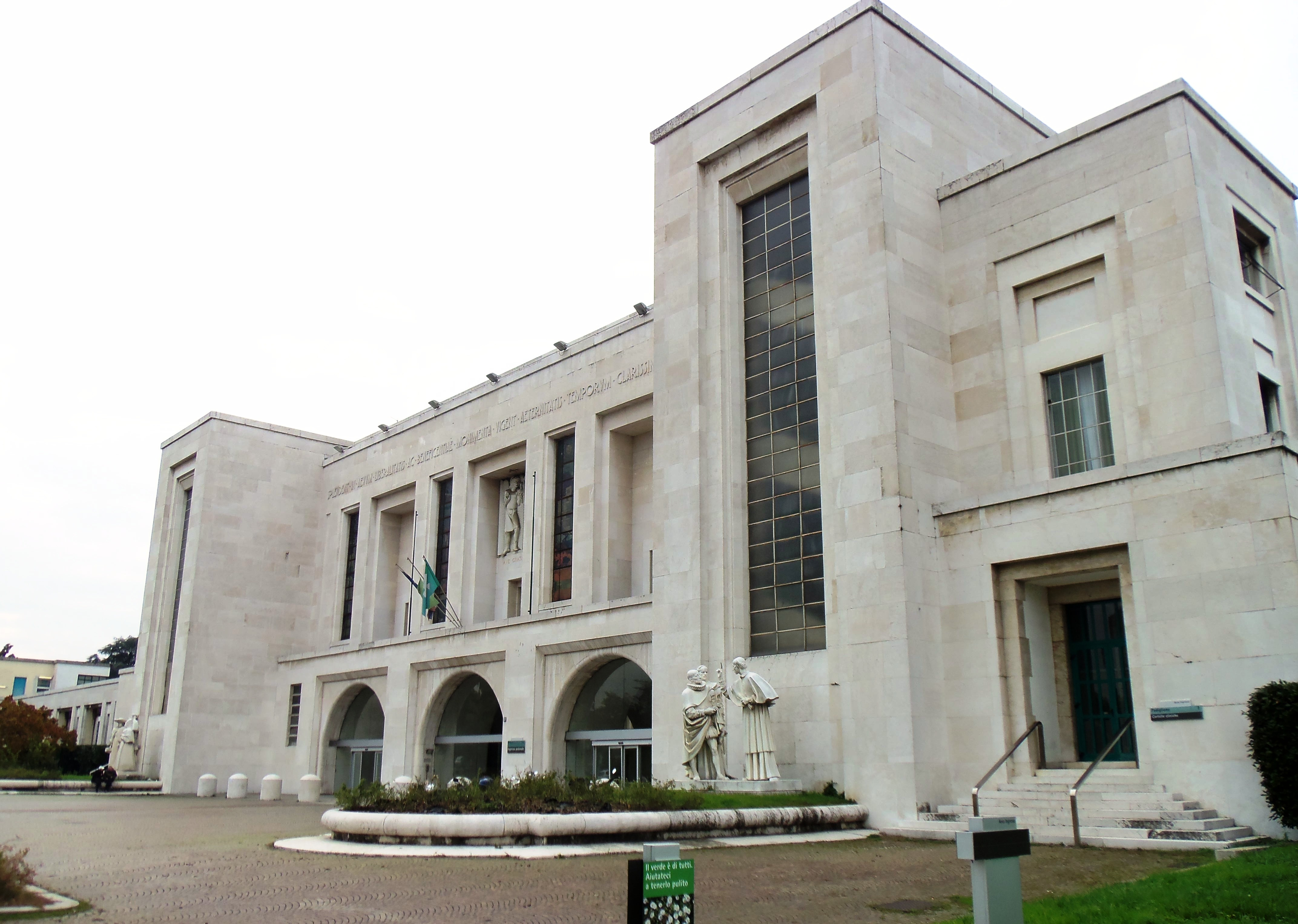
Ospedale Niguarda Ca' Granda in Milan

In 1978, a health reform introduced the National Health Service (Servizio Sanitario Nazionale – SSN). The SSN is a public and universalistic system aimed at guaranteed healthcare for all citizens. It was planned to be an entitlement and was not means-tested. Later, the financial situation urged to introduce user charges in order to avoid wastages, even if this might lead to inequalities, and means-testing for common tests and medicine. In 1992 a major reform allowed citizens to pay higher fees in order to receive private services within the SSN; by this way, public spending decreased. Today the SSN is financed both by direct taxes and by the revenues of the local health agencies, made by partial or total payments on services. The SSN is mainly dealt by regions, which control the local health agencies and set the level of user charges, however under the control of the Health Ministry. Differences between regions in wealth levels, political coalitions in office and competence of the political elite brought to very different outcomes, as the "Red Belt" of central-Italian communist-led regions is thought to have the best, more comprehensive, cheap and universal healthcare system; the Northern Christian Democracy-led regions are thought to have quite good but expensive healthcare system, while the Southern regions are often charged with malasanità – bad healthcare.

A specialistic visit costs around €30 and the price of a single envelope of drugs is €2, the same visit and the same drugs when done privately can rise many times. People in financial distress pay nothing for the aforementioned things.

=== Education and cultural resources ===
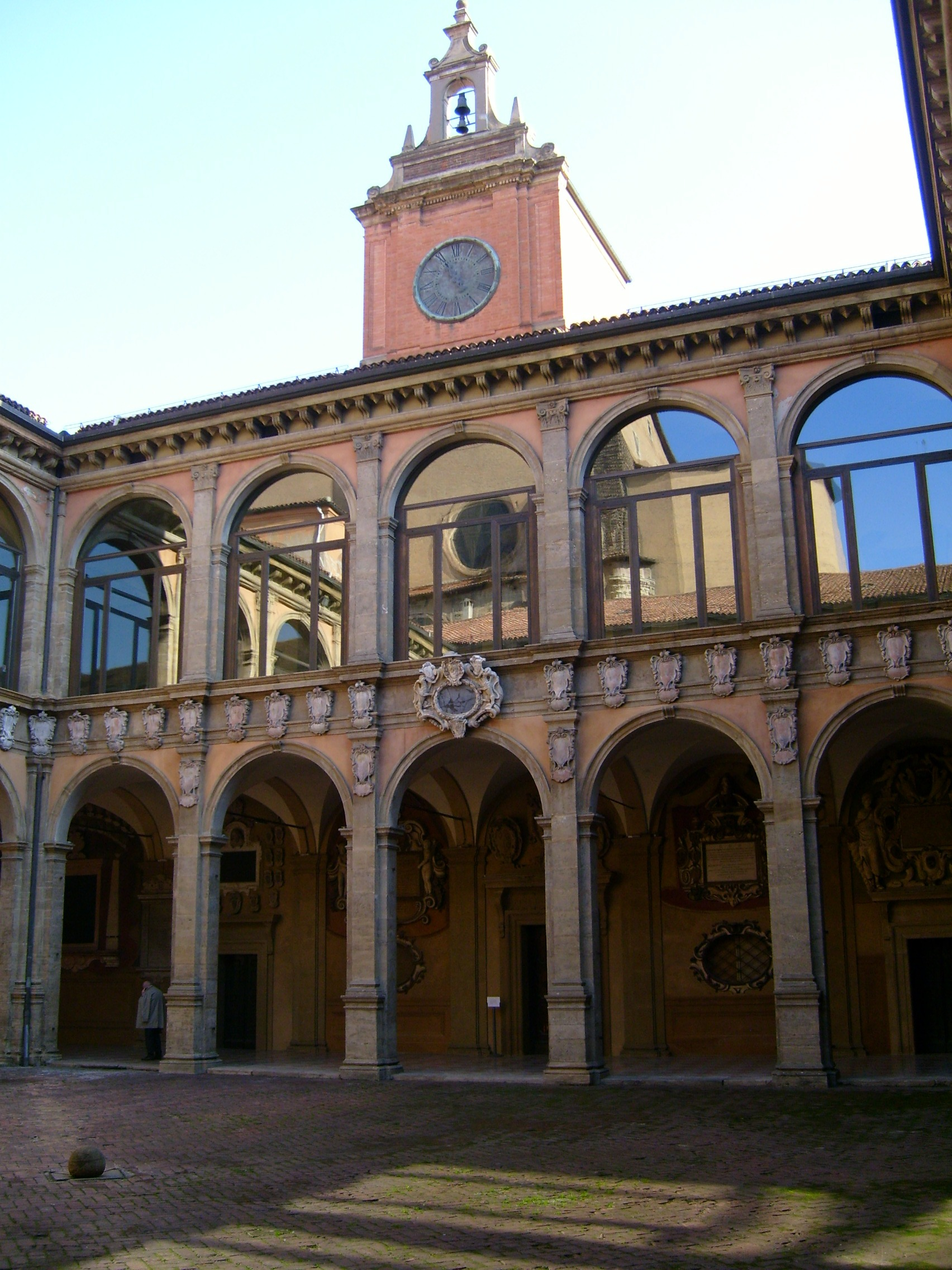
University of Bologna, established in AD 1088, is the world's oldest university in continuous operation.

Education is free and compulsory for children between 6 and 16 years of age. It includes five years of universal primary school, three years of secondary school and finally five years of high school leading to the Maturità exam and the award of a "diploma", which, in turn gives access to professions such as draughtsman-surveyor or teacher, and university courses. Primary school includes free books but not uniform or transport, and from the age of 12 the cost of books and transport, and all other fees for secondary school, are the responsibility of the family. Sometimes some families on low incomes who are eligible for means tested benefits can apply for a voucher to contribute to payment for the stipulated textbooks which are very numerous and expensive in Italy. Universities are both public and private; public universities are mainly financed by the state and have low, income-related fees and means-tested support for low-income students, while private universities have much higher fees. Students in primary and secondary education still have to pay minimal enrolment fees, usually around €20 per year, and the cost of books is not always covered by state vouchers.

=== Housing ===
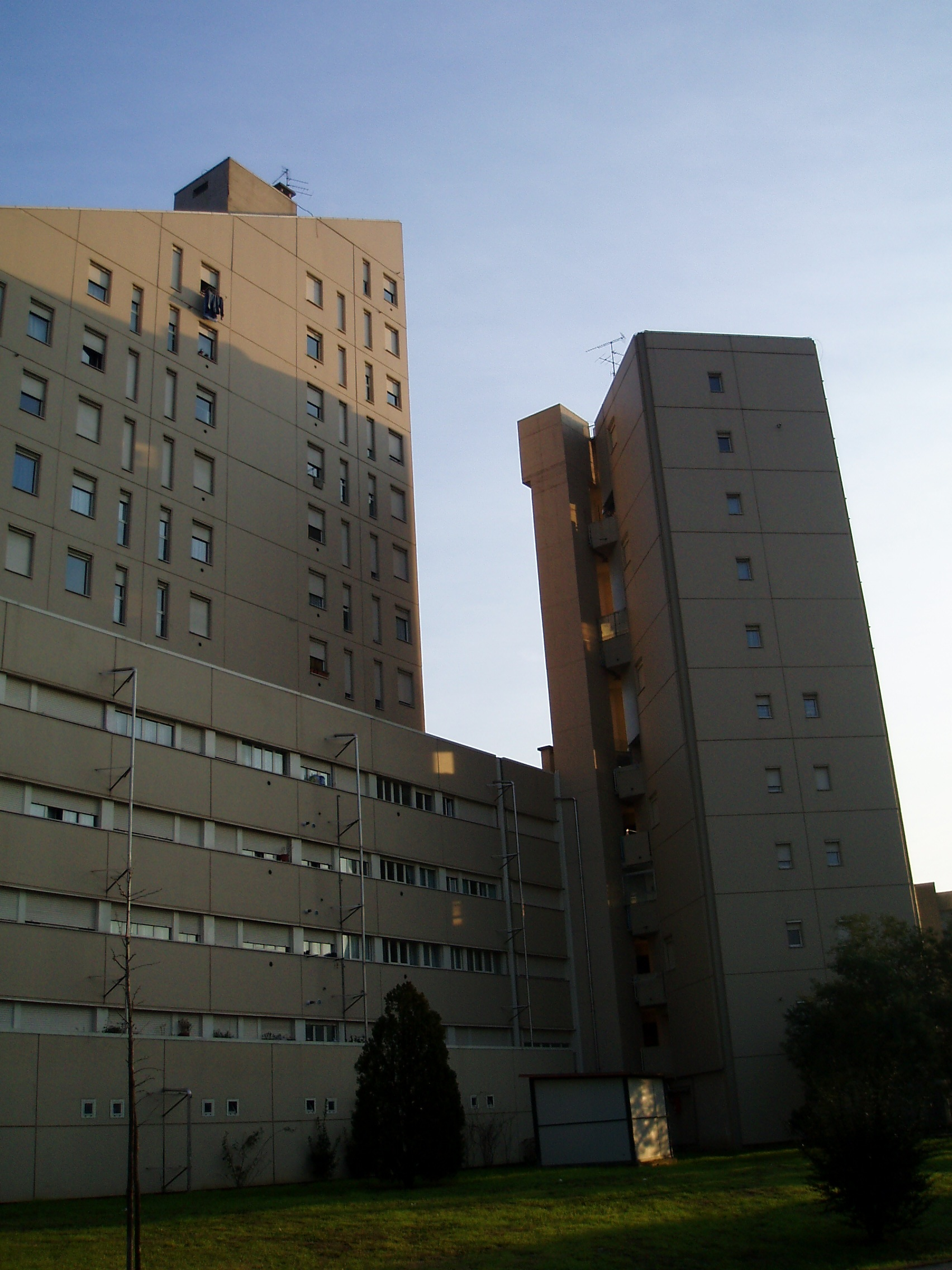
Public housing in Pistoia

The problem of cheap and healthy housing for low-income people led to the passing of the 1903 Luzzati Act, which stipulated the setting up of public, non-profit, local housing authorities to build and rent apartments to meet the needs of an increasing urban population. Those agencies were reformed in 1938 but still deal with public housing: the waiting list for public flats, and the fee, is means-tested and open to immigrants. In 1962, Act n.167 encouraged the purchase, by local authorities, of land to be used for public housing.

In 1978 the Fair Rent Act (Equo Canone) introduced a maximum fee for residential properties and four-year leases. Maximum rents were increased much more slowly than the rate of inflation and did not take account of changes in the urban population. This led landlords to prefer selling to renting, or to opt for black-market negotiations of fees, which in turn led to a restriction in the rental market. In 1998, only 20% of the Italian housing market was rental; middle- and high-income families preferred to buy their home, while low-income families that could not afford to buy suffered from high rents. The 1998 Rent Act tried to revitalise the rental sector by liberalising maximum rents and allowing rental conditions to be set by landlords’ and tenants’ organisations.

=== Unemployment ===
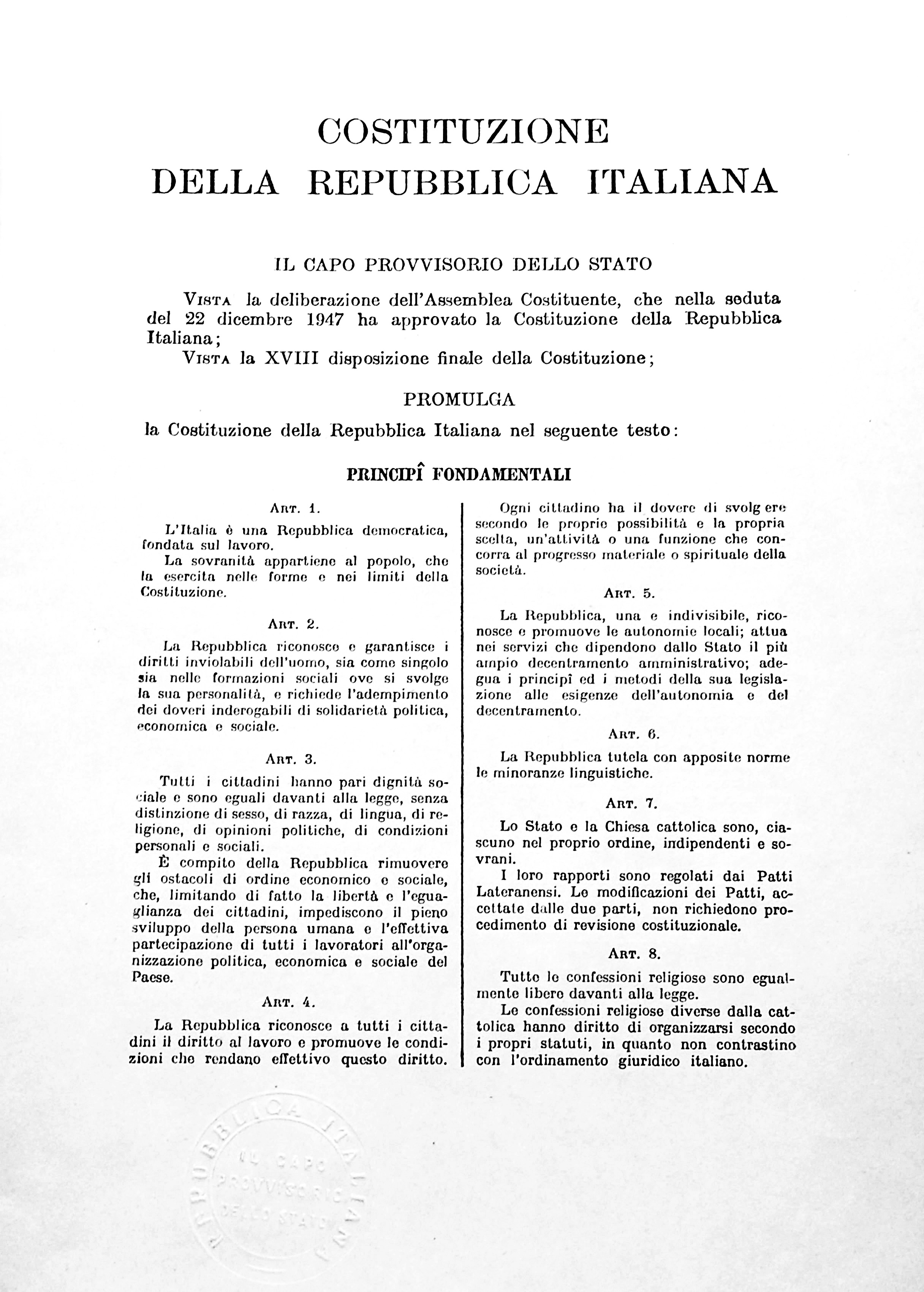
One of three original copies of the Constitution of Italy, now in the custody of Historical Archives of the President of the Republic. In Italy unemployment benefits are guaranteed by the Constitution. Article 38 ("Economic relations") states "[...] workers have the right to the provision of financial support sufficient to meet their needs in case of accidents at work, ill health, disability, old age and involuntary unemployment [...]".

The problem of unemployment has been moderated in Italy by governmental benefits, in the form of cash transfers based on contributions (indennità di disoccupazione). The requirement for claimants to obtain up to 40 percent of the individual's previous wages (for a maximum of around €1000 in 2007) for up to seven months is to have been previously employed and enrolled for unemployment insurance, making contributions for at least 52 weeks in two years. The extremely high unemployment rates that Italy faced in the 1980s brought unemployment benefits to be the first item of increase in social security spending, and contributed to the rise of the Italian public debt.

Since 1947, and with reforms in 1975, cash benefits are provided as shock absorbers to those workers who are suspended or who work only for reduced time due to temporary difficulties of their factories. This institute, the Redundancy Fund (Cassa integrazione guadagni), aims to help factories in financial difficulty, by underwriting the costs of the inactive workforce, also supporting those workers that might lose part of their income. The workers receive 80 percent of their previous wages, under a maximum level established by the law, and their contributions for pensions are considered as paid, even if they are not (contributi figurativi).

Along with Redundancy Funds, since 1984 companies can apply also for Solidarity Contracts: after a negotiation with the local trade unions, the company can establish contracts with reduced work time, in order to avoid dismissing workers. The state will grant to those workers 60 percent of the lost part of the wage. Such contracts can last up to four years, or five in the south. Since 1993, Solidarity Contracts can also be adopted by companies not entitled to Redundancy Funds. In this case, the state and the company will each grant 25 percent of the reduced part of workers' wages, for up to two years.

If the Redundancy Fund does not allow the company to re-establish a good financial situation, the workers can be entitled to mobility allowances (Indennità di mobilità), if they have a continuing employment contract and they have been employed for the previous twelve months. Other companies are provided incentives to employ them. Unemployment allowance can generally be claimed for up to 12 months. To remain entitled to allowances, the worker cannot refuse to attend a training course, or to take a similar job with a wage worth over 90 percent of the previous one, or to communicate to the Social Security Board to have found a temporary or a part-time job.

There is also the citizens' income (Italian: reddito di cittadinanza). It is a social welfare system created in Italy in January 2019. Although its name recalls one of a universal basic income, this provision is actually a form of conditional and non-individual guaranteed minimum income. The citizens' income was proposed by the Five Star Movement and was approved under the first Conte cabinet.

=== Pensions ===
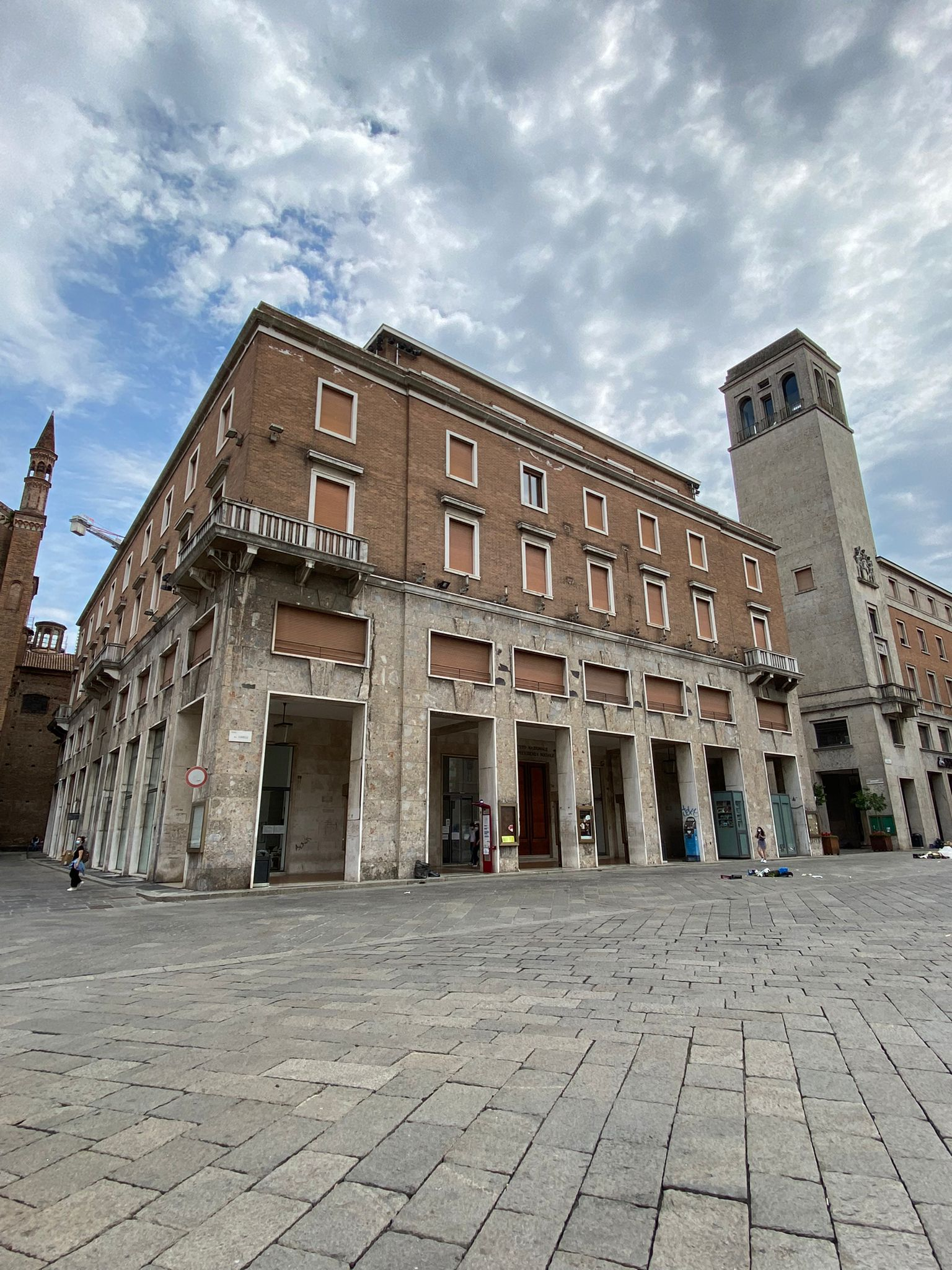
Italian National Institute for Social Insurance building in Piacenza

Italian pension spending is high in comparison to its OECD counterparts. Italy spent the most on public sector pensions as a percentage of GDP among OECD nations. This accounted for 16.3 percent of GDP in 2013. Italian pensions are among the most generous in the developed world in terms of income replacement. The net income replacement rate for Italian pensions in 2016 was 93 percent. According to 2016 OECD data, the normal age of a retiree in Italy is 66.6 years old. The earliest at a which a person is eligible for full retirement benefits is 62.8 years.

The history of pensions in Italy dates back to the institution in 1898 of the Factory Workers National Insurance Fund for Invalidity and Ageing (CNAS), a voluntary insurance that received grants from the State as well as from employers. In 1919 it became compulsory and it covered 12 million workers: the Agency was renamed the National Institute for Social Insurance (INPS) in 1933. In 1939 unemployment insurance, tuberculosis benefits, widow's pensions and family allowances were established, along with the first forms of redundancy funds; pension ages were lowered. In 1952 pensions were reformed, and minimum pensions were introduced. In 1968–69 the contribution-based system was changed to a earnings-based system, related to previous wages. New measures were introduced for workers and employers to deal with a production crisis. In the 1980s INPS got linked to the new healthcare system, and in 1989 it went through an administrative reform. From the following year private workers' pensions were linked to their company's annual income. The financial disorders of the early 1990s brought a raising of the pension age in 1992 and the introduction of the voluntary private insurance schemes the following year. The reform, in order to decrease both fragmentation and public spending, was completed by the Dini Act in 1995 that introduced a flexible pension age between 57 and 65 years, and swung back to the contribution-based system. Pension coverage for new flexible workers was introduced in 1996. Finally, in 2004 the Maroni Act tried to reform restrictively the pension system starting from 2008, but its effects are supposed to get deeply smoothed by the new centre-left government in charge since 2006.

=== Family policies, elderly and disabled care, social assistance ===
Maternity leave consists of two months before and three months after birth. Mothers are granted 80 percent of their previous wages and an additional six months of optional leave. They have the right to retain their job for one year. Family benefits are related to family size and income, with increased payments for disabled family members. Social assistance is entitlement-based and means tested, and applies to needy families. Social services to the elderly, the disabled, and needy families are dealt with by local authorities, sometimes with the assistance of volunteer associations and no-profit social service cooperatives. Disabled people without work receive around €270 each month.

== Historical overview ==
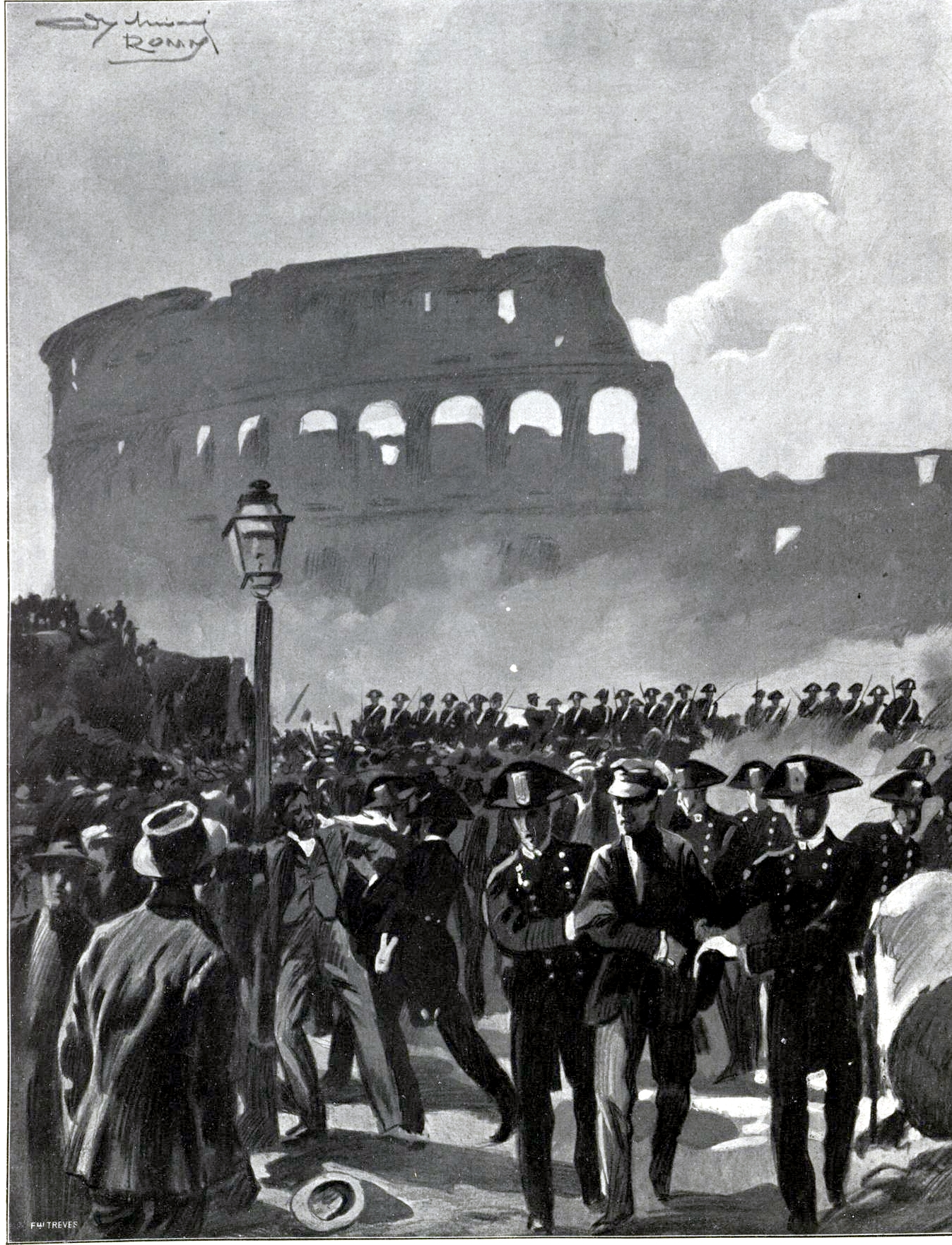
General strike of September 1914 in Rome, during which scuffles and arrests took place

The Italian welfare state's foundations were laid along the lines of the corporatist-conservative model, or of its Mediterranean variant. Later in the 1960s and 1970s, increases in public spending and a major focus on universality brought it on the same path as social-democratic systems.

The rate of growth in social spending in Italy varied in the last few decades of the twentieth century. For the years 1970–1980, the average rate of growth was 4.1 percent. This increased to 4.4 percent for the years 1980–1990 and then decreased significantly to an average of 1.9 percent for the period 1990–2000. Reduced growth rates in the latter period occurred amidst a wave of welfare state reforms in the "southern European" states. In Italy, reforms targeted inequities in pension programs that favoured specific segments of the population. This was accomplished through multiple rounds of pension reform in the 1990s. Reforms elsewhere sought to extend social insurance to a broader proportion of the Italian population and included the extension of some social services and means-tested programmes for poor households. Despite reform efforts, Italy faces challenges from high unemployment, especially among youth and women. Italians aged 15–24 were unemployed at a rate of 34.7 percent in 2017. Women were unemployed at an overall rate of 12.4 percent, with women aged 20–24 and 25–34 being unemployed at rates of 34.6 and 19 percent respectively.

Reforms in the late 1990s led to non-profits and charities providing more welfare services on behalf of the government. This blurred the lines between the formal welfare systems administered by the state and informal systems organised by private groups. The Catholic bloc found itself as a mediating force in the transition, with the church involved in public dialogue that furthered its own socially conservative views and its charities filling these devolved welfare roles.

Gendered familial assumptions historically defined the Italian welfare system. In this changing period, however, these assumptions were challenged by rising female labour market participation. Stress on the welfare system was the result of tensions between aspects of the state that seek to equalise across gendered roles, and welfare provisions that perpetuate them.

Concurrently, economic migration for domestic labour became a larger factor in the Italian welfare state. Greater female labour market participation increased the demand for domestic labour. In this labour-intensive field, migrants could only compete on wages by working in the informal economy. Decentralising reforms essentially made some welfare provisions accessible to migrants informally. Although immigration law was strengthened in 1992, enforcement actions were sporadic, rendering it an ineffective deterrent to informal immigration.

As the 2000s came around Italy's welfare system expenditures favoured the elderly and middle aged for pensions and those who have worked in the formal workforce, especially those employed by large industrial companies. The younger generation is left in the lurch as many of them, even those with higher educations and degrees, have never been able to find a job and must rely on their parents for support. Those who can get a job often take temporary work, lower paying jobs, and jobs which have nothing to do with their education. The unemployment rate for Italy's youth is over 40 percent. One of the population groups benefiting from the Italian welfare system's spending, over $900 million in 1995, is mothers. Women are given maternity leave for two months before birth to three months after and are paid 80 percent of their salary. They are also offered an additional six months leave if they choose, and their jobs must be guaranteed for one year.

== See also ==
- Social Model
- Welfare state
