= Southern question =

Economic gap between northern and southern Italy

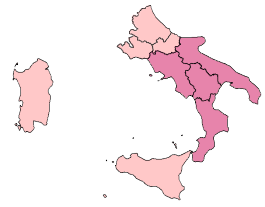
The Mezzogiorno (broad definition in light pink, narrow definition in dark pink)

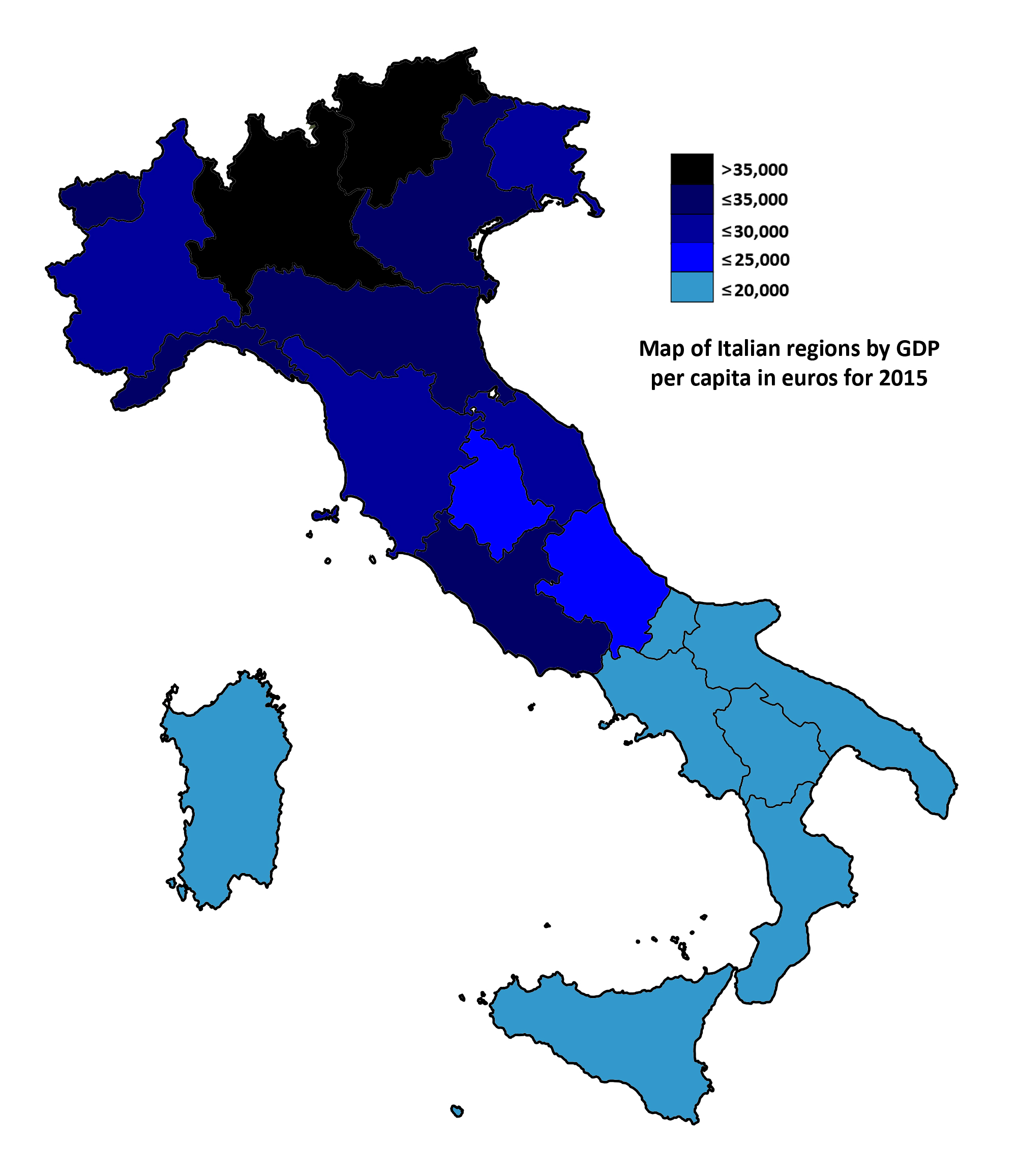
Map of Italian regions by GDP per capita in euros (2015)

1946 Italian monarchy referendum, in which Southern Italy voted to keep the monarchy, and Northern Italy (successfully) voted to abolish it.

In Italian historiography, the southern question (Italian: questione meridionale) is the perception, dating back to the aftermath of the unification of Italy, that southern Italy is persistently backwards in terms of socioeconomic development compared to the other regions of the country, especially the ones in northern Italy. First used in 1873 by Lombard classical radical and Historical Far Left deputy Antonio Billia, meaning the disastrous economic situation of the south of Italy compared to other regions of united Italy, it is used in common parlance even into the 21st century. The great southern emigration began only a few decades after the unification of Italy, where in the first half of the 19th century it had already affected several areas in the north, particularly Piedmont, Comacchio, and Veneto. The historical reasons for the first southern emigration in the second half of the 19th century are to be found in widespread literature both in the crisis of the countryside and grain, and in the situation of economic impoverishment affecting the south in the aftermath of unification, when industrial investments were concentrated in the northwest, as well as in other factors.

Between 1877 and 1887 (the governments led by Agostino Depretis, a member of the Historical Left who practised trasformismo), Italy had passed new protectionist tariff laws to protect its weak industry. These laws penalized agricultural exports from the south, favoured industrial production concentrated in the north, and created the conditions for the corrupt mixing of politics and economics. According to Giustino Fortunato, these measures determined the final collapse of southern interests in the face of those of northern Italy. With the First World War, the relative development of the north, based on industry, was favoured by the war orders, while in the south, the conscription of young men to arms left the fields neglected, depriving their families of all sustenance, since, in the absence of men at the front, southern women were not accustomed to working the land like peasant women in the north and centre; in fact, in the south, the arable land was often far from the homes, which were located in the villages, and even if they had wanted to, southern women would not have been able to do the housework and work the land at the same time, which was possible in northern and central Italy, where the peasants lived in farmhouses just a few meters from the land to be cultivated.

The policies implemented in the Italian fascist era to increase productivity in the primary sector were also unsuccessful: in particular, the agrarian policy pursued by Mussolini deeply damaged certain areas of the south. In fact, production focused mainly on wheat (battle for wheat) at the expense of more specialized and profitable crops that were widespread in the more fertile and developed southern areas. As for industry, it experienced during the "black twenty-year period" a long period of stagnation in the south, which is also noticeable in terms of employment. In the late 1930s, fascism gave a new impetus to its economic efforts in the south and in Sicily, but this was an initiative aimed at increasing the meagre consensus the regime enjoyed in the south and at popularizing in the south the world war that would soon engulf Italy.

The southern question remains unresolved into the 21st century for a number of economic reasons. Even after the Second World War, the development gap between the centre and the north could never be closed because between 1971 (the first year for which data are available) and 2017 the Italian state invested, on average per inhabitant, much more in the centre-north than in the south, making the gap not only unbridgeable but on the contrary accentuating it. According to the Eurispes: Results of the Italy 2020 report, if one were to consider the share of total public expenditure that the south should have received each year as a percentage of its population, it turns out that in total, from 2000 to 2017, the corresponding sum deducted from it amounts to more than 840 billion euros net (an average of about 46 billion euros per year).

== Situation before the unification of Italy ==
=== Political situation and framing ===
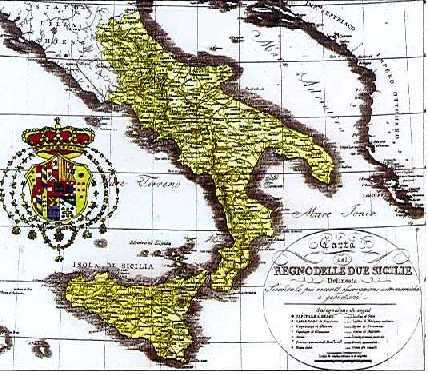
19th-century map of the Kingdom of the Two Sicilies

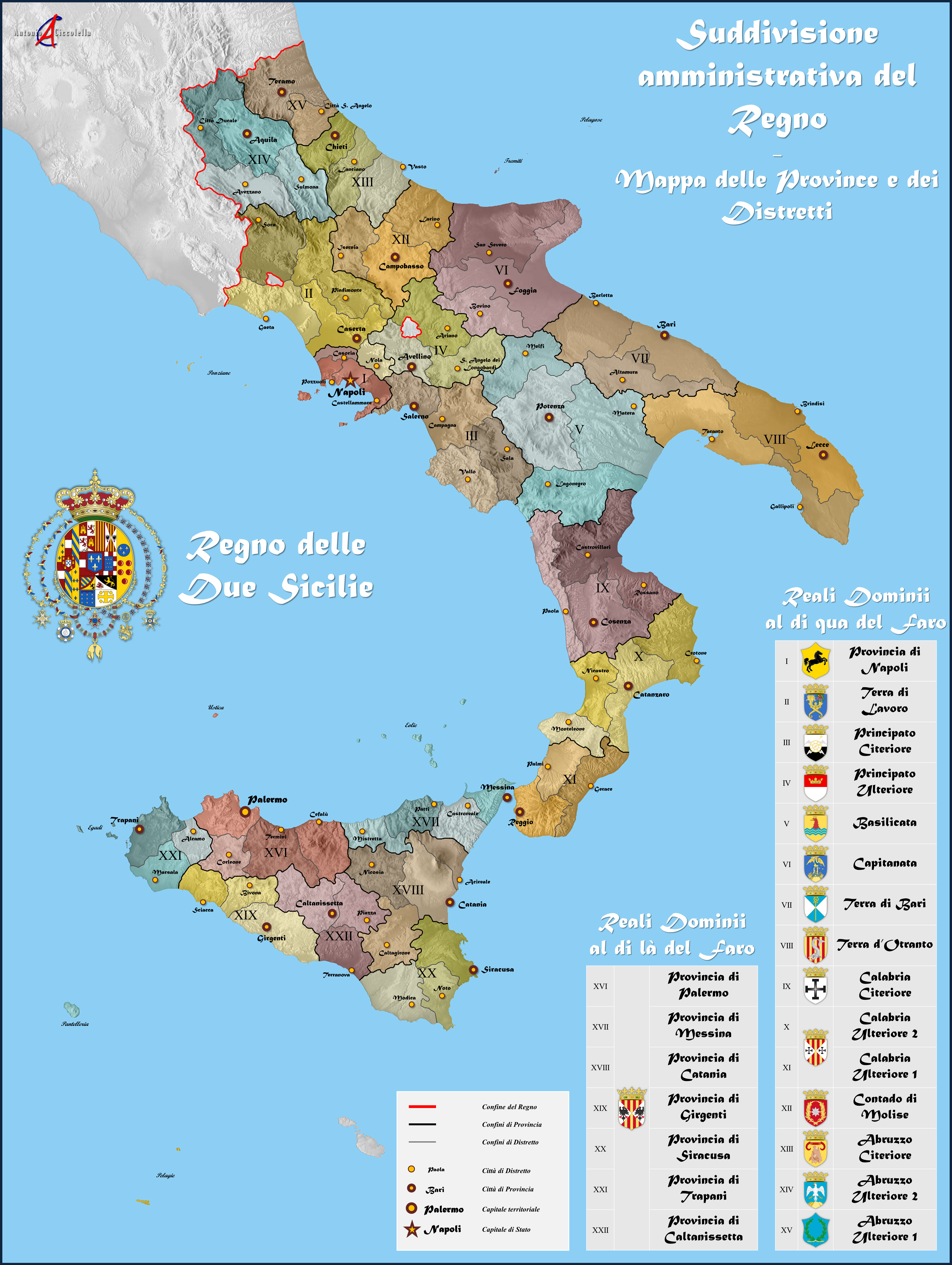
Administrative subdivision of the Bourbon kingdom

The origin of economic and social differences between Italian regions has long been controversial, partly because of the related ideological and political implications. The prevailing historiographical current argues that the differences between the different areas of the peninsula were already very pronounced at the time of unification: the intensive agriculture of the Po Valley, the drive to build roads and railways of Piedmont, and the role of trade and finance are contrasted with the approach that characterized the Kingdom of the Two Sicilies.

According to journalist and essayist Paolo Mieli, based on Vittorio Daniele and Paolo Malanima's work, Il divario Nord-Sud in Italia 1861-2011 (Rubbettino), the Bourbon territories presented in the years of national unification, economic conditions quite similar to those of the northern areas and that indeed the per capita GDP of the south was higher, albeit slightly, than that of the north. In contrast, American economist Richard S. Eckaus argued there was an economic depression in the south prior to unification.

According to Francesco Saverio Nitti, between 1810 and 1860, while states such as Britain, the United States, France, Germany, and Belgium experienced progress, pre-unification Italy had great difficulties in growth, largely due to various issues such as internal rebellions and wars of independence. The situation was also exacerbated by malaria, which plagued the south of Italy in particular. Nitti believed that, prior to unification, there were no marked economic differences at the territorial level, and in every area of pre-unification Italy there was a scarcity of large industries:

Before 1860 there was hardly a trace of large industry throughout the peninsula. Lombardy, now so proud of its industries, had almost nothing but agriculture; Piedmont was an agricultural and thrifty land, at least in the habits of its citizens. Central Italy, southern Italy and Sicily were in a very modest state of economic development. Whole provinces, whole regions were almost closed to all civilization.

— Francesco Saverio Nitti, Nord e Sud, p. 2

About the conditions of economic and productive development in pre-unification Italy, Antonio Gramsci took a different view than Nitti, and according to the Marxist politician and historian at the date of Italian unification there were instead profound differences in economic organisation and infrastructure between the northern and southern parts of the Italian peninsula.

In the new Italy, the two parts of the peninsula, the south and the north, which had been united for more than a thousand years, found themselves in completely opposite situations. The Lombard invasion had finally broken the unity created by Rome, and in the north the communes had given history a particular impetus, while in the south the rule of the Swabians, Anjou, Spain and the Bourbons had given it another. On the one hand, the tradition of a certain autonomy had created a bourgeoisie that was bold and full of initiative, and there was an economic organisation similar to that of other European states, conducive to the further development of capitalism and industry. In the other, the paternalist administrations of Spain and the Bourbons had created nothing: the bourgeoisie did not exist, agriculture was primitive and not even sufficient to satisfy the local market; there were no roads, no ports, no exploitation of the few waters that the region possessed because of its peculiar conformation. Unification brought the two parts of the peninsula into close contact.

— Antonio Gramsci, La questione meridionale, p. 5

According to Denis Mack Smith's exposition in his work History of Italy from 1861 to 1998, starting in 1850, Cavour's Piedmont was led by a liberal elite that marked a radical acceleration, with the declared aim of confronting the major European powers. The civil code was reformed on the model of the more advanced but decidedly centralist French code. A new bank was founded to provide credit to industrial enterprises, and duties were significantly reduced by an average of 10 per cent in comparison with 100 per cent in the south. Technicians were sent to England to study the war industry, and infrastructure was greatly developed: the Cavour canal, begun in 1857, made the Vercelli and Novara region fertile, railways were expanded so that by 1859 Piedmont possessed half the mileage of the entire peninsula, and by 1868, the Moncenisio railway (since 1871 replaced by the Fréjus tunnel) soon made it possible to reach Paris in a single day's journey. Nitti argued that this transformation entailed huge public expenditures that led the Sardinian kingdom into a deep financial depression, as many public works proved unproductive. According to Nitti, without detracting from the great merits of Piedmont in the face of Italian unification, the situation of the Kingdom of Sardinia, in order to avoid bankruptcy, could only be resolved by "mixing Piedmont's finances with those of another, larger state".

In the climate of restoration following the Sicilian uprisings of 1848, the Kingdom of the Two Sicilies had pursued a conservative policy. The Bourbon government, according to Mack Smith, traced an aristocratic model, based on lower levels of taxes and low spending on infrastructure. Economic policy was paternalistic: domestic production was protected by high duties on the import of goods and food prices were kept low by the prohibition of exporting grain, while land ownership was concentrated among a few landowners who held it as a latifundium, or held in mortmain by the Church, while feudal rights to tithe and public use of communal lands still applied. Nitti assessed that the system adopted by the Bourbons was due to a lack of vision, a refusal to look to the future, a principle he judged to be narrow and almost patriarchal, but which at the same time guaranteed a "rough prosperity that made the life of the people less torturous than it is now".

The causes of the southern problem must be sought in the many political and socio-economic events that the south has undergone over the centuries: In the absence of a communal period, which would have stimulated intellectual and productive energies; in the persistence of foreign monarchies, incapable of creating a modern state; in the centuries-long domination of a baronage, holder of all privileges; in the persistence of the latifundium; in the absence of a bourgeois class, creator of wealth and animator of new forms of political life; in the nefarious and corrupting Spanish domination. Of particular importance was the almost systematic alliance between foreign monarchies and the nobility, based on the maintenance of the feudal regime. This alliance prevented the emergence of an active, enterprising bourgeoisie. The problems of integrating the south into the new unified nation-state were also generated because of the profound socio-cultural differences between the Kingdom of the Two Sicilies and the other pre-unitary states:

Almost none of these northern administrators liked being sent to Naples or Sicily: they all soon came up against local systems of patronage, clientelism and nepotism, and few were able to avoid compromise.

— Denis Mack Smith, Il Risorgimento italiano, p. 525

The situation was exacerbated by extensive and widespread administrative corruption. In the years following national unification, the average life expectancy in the south was several years shorter than in the north, and there was a higher incidence of malnutrition and undernourishment. The socioeconomic situation in the Kingdom of the Two Sicilies was succinctly described by British historian Denis Mack Smith as follows:

This difference between North and South was fundamental. A peasant from Calabria had little in common with one from Piedmont, and Turin was infinitely more like Paris and London than Naples and Palermo, for these two halves were on quite different levels of civilization. Poets might write of the South as the garden of the world, the land of Sybaris and Capri, and stay-at-home politicians sometimes believed them; but in fact, most southerners lived in squalor, afflicted by drought, malaria, and earthquakes. The Bourbon rulers of Naples and Sicily before 1860 had been staunch supporters of a feudal system glamorized by the trappings of a courtly and corrupt society. They had feared the traffic of ideas and had tried to keep their subjects insulated from the agricultural and industrial revolutions of northern Europe. Roads were scanty or nonexistent, and passports were necessary even for internal travel.

— Denis Mack Smith, History of Italy from 1861 to 1997 (English ed.), p. 3

=== Economic situation ===
In short, southern Italy unfortunately became part of the new kingdom under conditions quite different from what Nitti would have us believe. It lived on a primitive economy in which there was almost no division of labour and exchange was reduced to a minimum: people tended to work for their own subsistence rather than to produce exchange value and to obtain what they needed by selling products. In many communes, well over half the population never ate wheat bread, and "the peasants lived by working like beasts", so much so that "the maintenance of each of them cost less than the maintenance of a donkey": this is what Ludovico Bianchini, one of Ferdinand II's ministers, wrote.

— Giustino Fortunato, Il Mezzogiorno e lo Stato italiano, vol. II, p. 340

To correctly interpret the economic and social situation, it must be considered that the Kingdom was not a uniform reality within itself, and indeed, regional differences were more pronounced than in modern Italy. In general, wealth increased from inland to the coast and from the countryside to the city. Naples, with as many as 450,000 inhabitants, was by far among the top cities in Europe by population. Its province could compete with the more developed provinces of the northwest, while there were extremely poor areas, such as the Calabrian, Sicilian and Lucanian hinterlands. According to Giustino Fortunato such a state of profound difference between the city of Naples and the poor provinces of the kingdom would have influenced the events of the Risorgimento in the south: "If the provinces, and not the capital, preceded the few insurrections that led to Garibaldi's landing in Reggio di Calabria, it was perhaps due in no small part to an ascetic sense of aversion to the excessive, enormous preponderance of the city of Naples, made too great, if not rich, at the cost of a small and too miserable dark kingdom....."

Normalised industrialisation index of Italian provinces in 1871 (national average is 1.0). Source: Bank of Italy. Over 1.4 From 1.1 to 1.4 From 0.9 to 1.1 Up to 0.9

Sicily constituted a case apart: the end of the uprisings of 1848 had reestablished its reunification with the rest of the peninsula, yet independence continued to be strong and would be instrumental in supporting Giuseppe Garibaldi's landing. In general, the situation of pre-unification Italy was disadvantaged compared to that of other Western European states and decidedly poor by 21st-century standards. In a country relatively overpopulated and poor in raw materials, the economy was deeply based on agriculture. Of the 22 million inhabitants recorded by the 1861 census, 8 million were employed in agriculture, compared with 3 million employed in industry and handicrafts. Moreover, of these, about 80 per cent were women employed only seasonally. According to the traditional view, the level of productivity in the different regions was radically different, whether due to natural causes or the techniques adopted. The nature of the southern terrain reduced the availability and regularity of water, reducing the possibilities for cultivation. Centuries of deforestation and lack of investment in land care and channelisation facilitated erosion and the persistence of extensive swamps, such as those in the Pontine or Fucine regions. In several areas, infectious diseases carried by marsh mosquitoes drove populations to retreat to the hills.

Mack Smith believes that in the Kingdom of the Two Sicilies, the method of cultivation was based on the feudal system: estates cultivated by labourers produced grain for self-consumption only. The aristocrats who owned them did not live on their estates and found it disreputable to deal with their management. Consequently, they had no interest in investing in improved production techniques or in more profitable crops such as olive trees or orchards, which could be productive after only a decade or so, preferring instead to grow wheat every year, even on unsuitable land: in 1851, Nassau William Senior noted that production per hectare in Sicily had not changed since the time of Cicero. The resulting prices were high and, together with tariff barriers, discouraged trade.

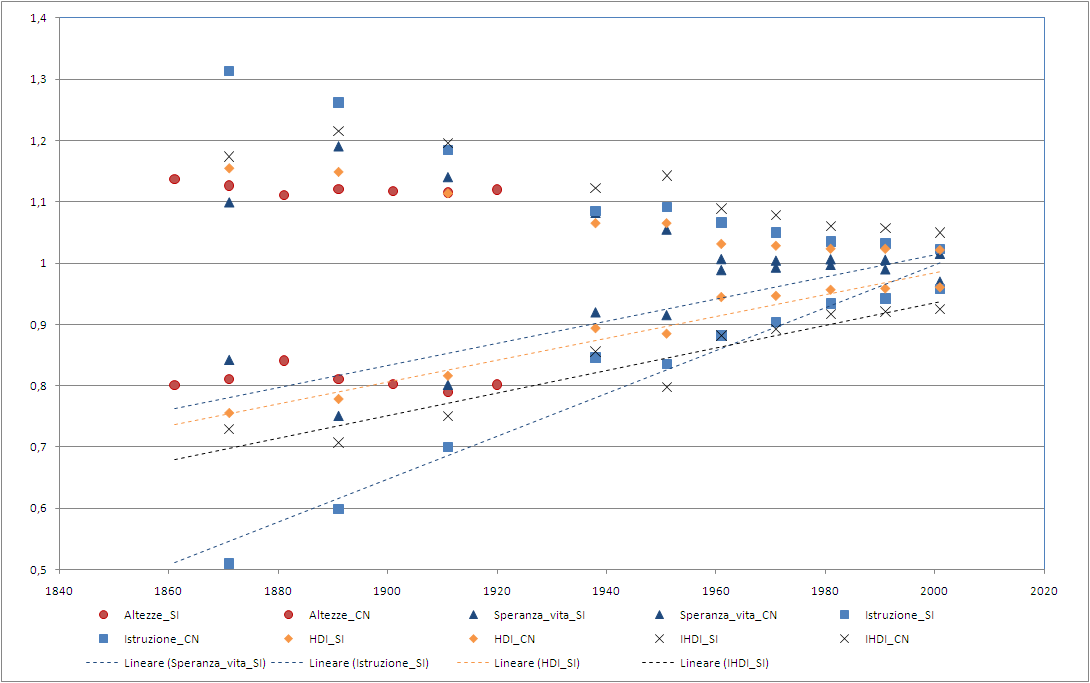
Convergence of Italian social development indicators: centre-north (CN, top) and south and islands (SI, bottom). Data: Emanuele Felice, 2007.

According to Mack Smith, the life of the labourers was quite miserable: malaria, brigandsm and the lack of water forced the populations to cluster in villages that were as far as twenty kilometres from the areas where they worked. Illiteracy was almost complete, and even in 1861, there were places where rent, tithes to the parish priest, and the "protection" of the field-guards were paid in kind. Unemployment was widespread, so much so that observers of the time reported how a southern peasant earned half as much as his northern equivalent, although wages were comparable. Agriculture was often insufficient; the Bourbon historian Giacinto de' Sivo specifically mentions that, "Due to poor harvests there was a shortage of grain ... but the government decided to buy grain abroad and sell it at a loss both here and in Sicily."

Inadequate agricultural production was also caused by the customs regime, which prohibited the export of cereals produced in the kingdom, so that production was for internal consumption, and an increase in production of 5 per cent led to a fall in prices, while on the contrary an insufficient production of 10–15 per cent led to a considerable rise in prices, which the ceiling tried in vain to prevent, causing the famine described by De Sivo, in addition to the situation of poor harvests, the mortmain and other restrictions on cultivation.
Moreover, in 1861 with a population of 38 percent of the Kingdom of Italy (including Lazio, Veneto and Friuli), the former Kingdom of the Two Sicilies had an average agricultural income of 30.6 percent. The situation was aggravated by the fact that per capita consumption of cereal products was higher in the south than in the north and centre, indicating the relative depression of the southern regions, a situation that persisted even in 1960. In contrast, the northeastern part of the country would have at least partially incorporated the techniques of the agricultural revolution of northern Europe, introduced during the Napoleonic campaigns. Agriculture was practised by farmers in the north and sharecroppers in Tuscany, and driven by the capitals of the cities, which acted as financial centres. Water legislation was more advanced and intensive canalisation allowed the intensive cultivation of rice, which could be exported.

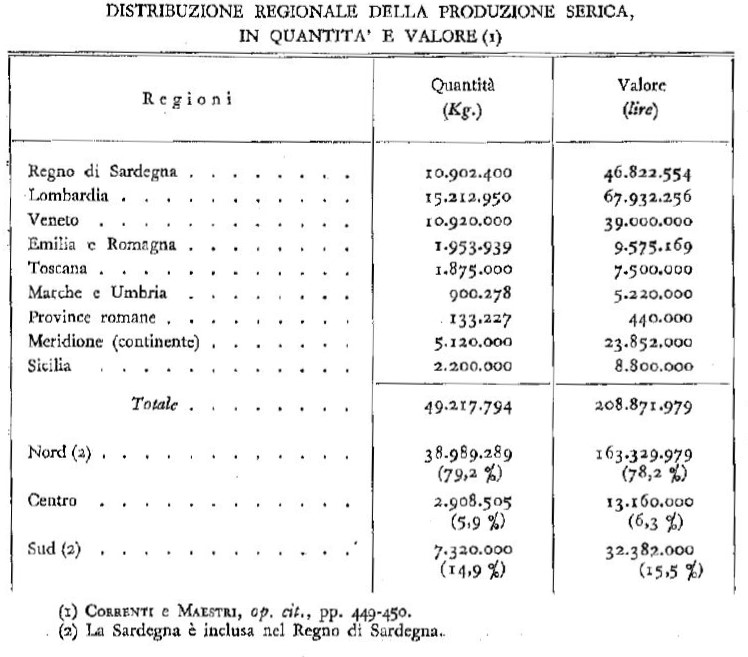
Silk production in the 1860s

Silk production was an important source of exports and foreign exchange, and production was heavily concentrated in the northern regions. As for industry, at the time of unification, it consisted mainly of a series of craft activities serving the elite. Italy was a country of second industrialisation because the lack of raw materials (iron and coal) slowed down its industrial development until around 1880. At the same time, low labour costs, difficult access to capital and a lack of technical expertise prevented the purchase of machinery from abroad to replace manual labour. One partial exception was mechanised weaving, which had become widespread since 1816, especially in the north-west, where waterways were abundant, and which, with the advent of the steam loom, would form the basis of widespread industrial capitalism. The main exports were wool and silk from Lombardy and Piedmont, followed by sulphur from Sicily for gunpowder. Child labour was widespread throughout the peninsula and remained so for a long time, as in the case of the carusi, the Sicilian term for children who worked in the sulphur mines. In his work The Italian Risorgimento, Mack Smith argues that "in many industries in Lombardy, the law of compulsory education was not observed, and two-fifths of the workers in the Lombard cotton industry were children under the age of twelve, mostly girls, who worked twelve and even sixteen hours a day."

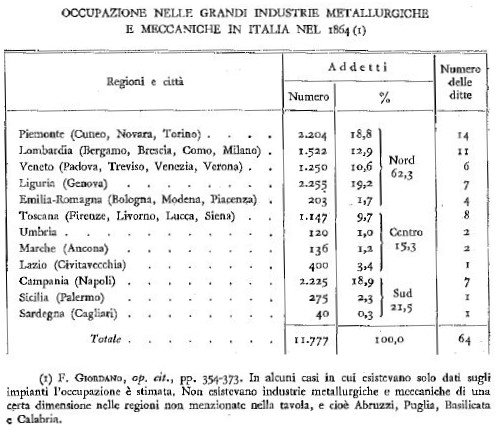
Number of workers employed in the major metallurgical and mechanical industries in 1864

Significant British capital was involved in sulfur mining, and it would remain relevant to the Sicilian economy until competition from the United States emerged. The south was not devoid of industry: the Officine di Pietrarsa, the Mongiana ironworks and the Castellamare di Stabia shipyards are often cited as examples, which the Crown strongly desired as strategic to reduce dependence on British imports; however, their impact on the Kingdom's economy was limited. Employment in the large mechanical and metallurgical industries in Italy, taking into account industries of a certain size in 1864, numbered 64 establishments with a total of 11,777 employees, of which in the north 46 establishments with 7,434 employees, in the centre 13 establishments with 1,803 employees and in the south 9 establishments with 2,540 employees, of which 7 establishments in Campania with 2,225 employees, 1 establishment in Sicily with 275 employees and 1 establishment in Sardinia with 40 employees. Industries of significant size were present in all regions except Abruzzi, Basilicata, Apulia and Calabria.

The poor development of industry in the pre-unification south is evidenced by the absence of the Kingdom of the Two Sicilies at the Great Exhibition of Industry in London in 1851 and the Exhibition of Industry at the Universal Exhibition in Paris in 1855, at which the Kingdom of Sardinia, the Grand Duchy of Tuscany and the Papal States were present. Southernist and Lucanian senator Giustino Fortunato expressed the following opinion on the problems related to the economy of the pre-unification south:

Since taxes were low, the public debt small and the currency abundant, our entire economic constitution was incapable of stimulating the production of wealth. With the exception of a few privileged industries on the Liri and Sarno rivers, which were maintained at the cost of extensive smuggling by the Swiss and French, it was exclusively agricultural.

— Giustino Fortunato, Il Mezzogiorno e lo Stato italiano, vol. II, pp. 339–340

Some astonishing firsts were achieved in the field of transport, such as the first steamship in Italy and the first iron bridge; however, investment in roads and railways was hampered by the hilly hinterland and maritime transport was favoured, facilitated by the significant expansion of the coastline, to the extent that the Bourbon merchant fleet became the third largest in Europe in terms of number of ships and total tonnage, despite the fact that the merchant navies of the other pre-unitary states in the north had greater tonnage. The fact remains that maritime transport was limited to the southern coasts and could not bring goods into the interior, where it had to be carried by animal-drawn wagons or pack animals, to the point that Giustino Fortunato stated in his political speeches that "... transport was carried out by pack animals, as in the plains of the East".

The tonnages of the merchant fleets of the peninsula in 1858 were as follows: Kingdom of Sardinia 208,218; Grand Duchy of Tuscany 59,023; Modena 980; Papal State 41,360; Two Sicilies 272,305; Venice and Trieste 350,899. Out of a total of 932,785 tonnes, the Bourbon kingdom thus had less than a quarter. On the size of the Bourbon merchant fleet, the southern historian Raffaele de Cesare, in his book La fine di un Regno, writes:

The merchant navy consisted almost entirely of small vessels, suitable for coastal sailing and fishing, and was manned by more than 40,000 seamen, a number inadequate to the tonnage of the ships. Navigation was limited to the Adriatic and Mediterranean coasts, and the slow progress of the naval forces consisted not in reducing the number of ships and increasing their range, but in multiplying small ships. The steam merchant navy was very scarce, although one of the first steamships to sail the waters of the Mediterranean was built in Naples in 1818. It appeared to be the largest in Italy, while in reality it was inferior to the Sardinian, and even as a navy it was scarce for a kingdom, a third of which was formed by Sicily and the other two-thirds by a large shipyard launched towards the Levant. The navy and the army were at odds: the army was disproportionate to the country by excess, the navy by deficiency.

— Raffaele de Cesare, La fine di un Regno, vol. II, pp. 165–166

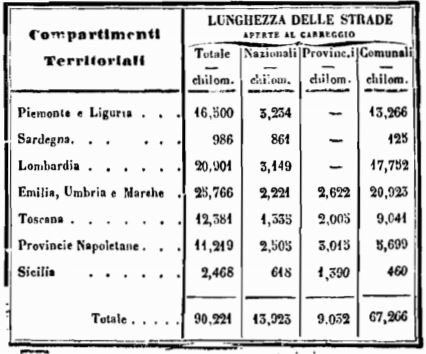
Roads in 1861. The data for Lombardy do not include the province of Mantua, which had not yet been annexed.

The opening of the 8 km of the Naples-Portici line in 1839, Italy's first railway, was met with great enthusiasm. Just 20 years later, the northern railways were 2035 km long, while Naples was only connected to Capua and Salerno, for a total of 98 km of railway. Similarly, according to Nicola Nisco, in 1860, 1621 out of 1848 towns were without roads and therefore virtually inaccessible, being served by sheep and mule tracks; the lack of road infrastructure was particularly acute in the Bourbon South, which had a road network of only 14,000 km out of the more than 90,000 km of the then unified peninsula, while Lombardy alone, four times smaller, had a road network of 28,000 km, with the road network of central Italy at the same level as Lombardy in terms of metres per square kilometre.

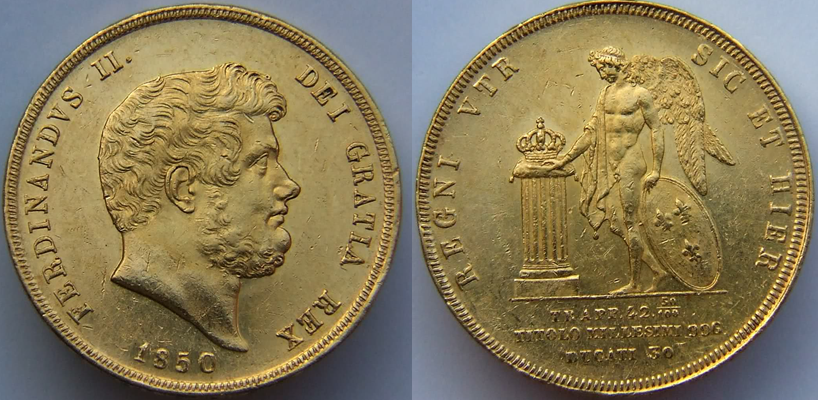
30 ducats, 1850

The scarcity of capital was felt everywhere, but especially in the south, where savings were immobilised in land or precious coins. In his essay "North and South", Nitti notes that when the coins of the pre-unitary states were unified, 443 million coins of various metals were withdrawn in the south, compared with 226 million in the rest of Italy. The substitution allowed different types of precious metals to be withdrawn, generating the feeling of a real expropriation, so much so that still in 1973 Antonio Ghirelli erroneously claimed that 443 million gold lire "ended up in the North".

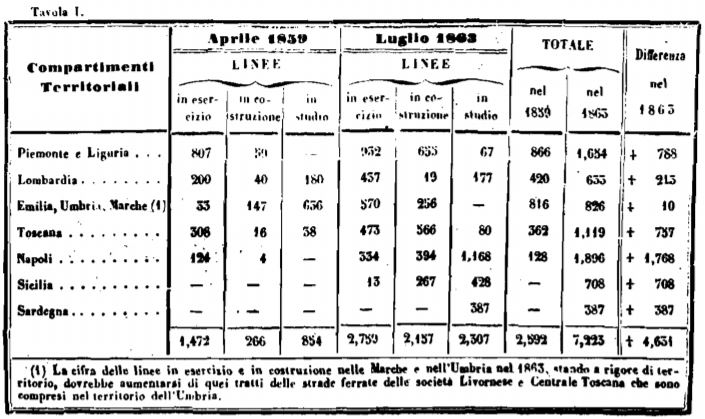
Railroads in the period 1859–1863

Capital from the new kingdom was used to build a southern railroad network, which in the south in 1859 was limited only to the area of Naples and its environs, and with an unprecedented effort, in July 1863, in the territories of the former Kingdom of the Two Sicilies the railroads increased from 128 km (124 in operation and 4 under construction in 1859) to 1896 km with an increase of 1768 km in the continental part (334 in operation, 394 under construction and 1,168 under consideration and later built), while in Sicily, where railways were nonexistent, it increased to 708 km (13 in operation, 267 under construction and 428 under consideration and later built). Piedmont's development came at a price: public accounts were severely affected both by the effort to modernize the economy and by the wars of unification. With the birth of the Unified Italy, the budgetary debts of the Kingdom of Sardinia were transferred to the coffers of the newly formed Italian State, which in the years following the unification financed the construction of many kilometres of roads and railways throughout the peninsula, particularly in the south, which at the time had few roads (14,000 km) and very few railways (about 100 km), but the construction of such infrastructure did not initiate a parallel economic development of the south compared to the rest of the peninsula. The economic gap was thus already evident by considering the statistical data referring to Italian joint-stock and limited partnerships at the time of unification, based on data on commercial and industrial companies taken from the Italian Statistical Yearbook of 1864.

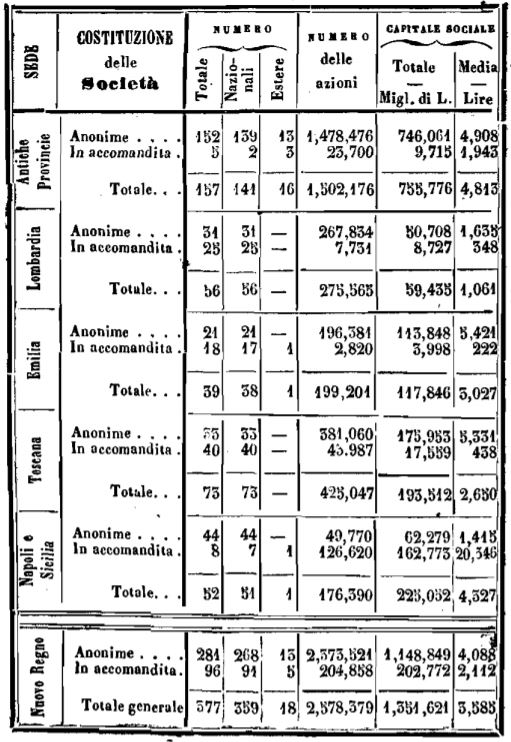
Joint-stock companies and limited partnerships in 1860

There were 377 anonymous and limited partnerships, 325 of which were in the centre-north, excluding from the count those existing in Lazio, Umbria, Marche, Veneto, Trentino, Friuli and Venezia Giulia; however, the share capital of these companies was a total of 1.353 billion, of which 1.127 billion were in companies in the centre-north (again disregarding Lazio, Umbria, Marche, Veneto, Trentino, and Friuli and Venezia Giulia) and only 225 million in the south. By way of comparison, the total financial reserve of the Bourbon state was 443.200 million liras; practically one-third of the capital of the anonymous and limited partnerships in the centre-north, excluding several territories not yet annexed. The anonymous and limited partnerships of the Kingdom of Sardinia alone had a total capital that was almost double that of the Bourbon state: 755.776 million versus 443.200 million in liquid assets. This calculation excludes all stock and limited companies in the northeast, since they were not included in the Kingdom of Italy in 1861. The annual import-export trade before 1859, including the territories not yet unified and subsequently annexed, reached a national total of 800,251,265 lire for imports and 680,719,892 lire for exports; in relation to these amounts, the Kingdom of the Two Sicilies imported goods worth 104,558,573 lire and exported 145,326,929 lire, representing only 13% of the value of imports and 21% of national exports on an annual basis.

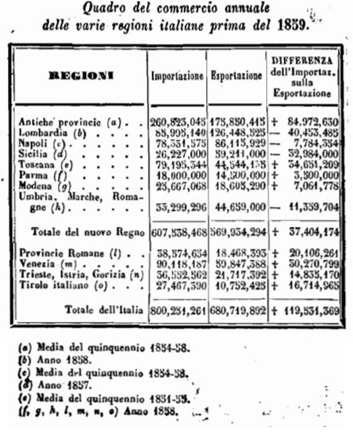
Import-export trade in 1859

At the time of unification, the banking system showed a predominance of the northern centre in terms of the number of branches and offices, the volume of operations and the capital moved, out of a partial national total (excluding Lazio, Tuscany, Veneto, Friuli Venezia Giulia, Trentino and Mantua) of 28 institutions and 120,025 discount transactions for a total of 465,469,753 lire and 24,815 advance transactions for a total of 141,944,725 lire, the branches in the former Kingdom of the Two Sicilies numbered 5 and carried out 8,428 discount transactions for a total of 33,574,295 lire and 1,348 advance transactions for 9,779,199 lire, noting also the partial figure of Sicily alone, which carried out most of the discount transactions, 4,388 for 17,743,368 lire, compared with the continental part of the Kingdom of the Two Sicilies, which carried out only 4,040 for 15,830,927 lire. The Genoa branch alone recorded 19,715 discount transactions for 113,189,568 lire and 1,578 advance transactions for 24,517,419 lire before unification, i.e. a volume almost three times greater than that of all the branches in the Kingdom of the Two Sicilies, as shown in the adjacent table.

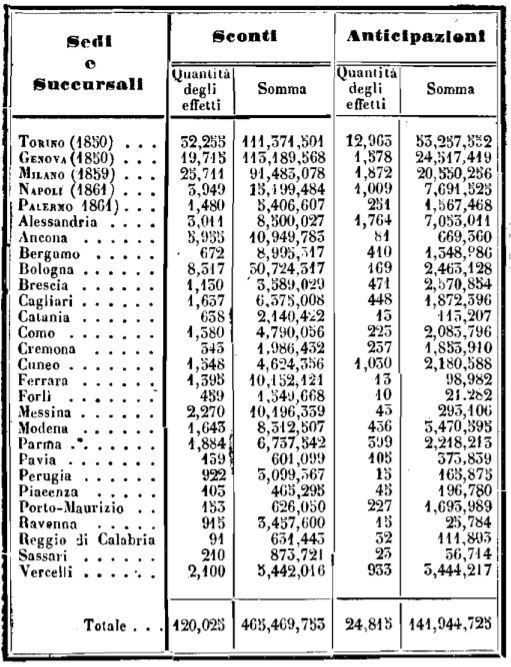
Banks in 1860

There was a wide gap in the field of savings institutions; in 1860 savings banks were widely spread in the central and northern territories, while they began to spread in the south only after unification, reaching in 1863 the number of 15 savings banks with 4,607 savings accounts for 1,181,693 lire out of a national total of 154 savings banks with 284,002 savings accounts for 188,629,594 lire, a partial figure and not including the institutions of Lazio, Veneto, Friuli Venezia Giulia and Trentino not yet annexed, as per the diagram on the side. Commenting on Bourbon policy, Giustino Fortunato, in his analysis of conditions in southern Italy at the time of the unification, said:

They were few, yes, the taxes, but they were badly distributed, and such that, on the whole, they represented a quota of 21 lire per inhabitant, which in Piedmont, whose private wealth was much more advanced than ours, was 25.60 lire. So not one third, but one fifth of Piedmont paid more than we did. And if taxes were milder here – not so milder that Luigi Settembrini, in his famous 'Protest' of 1847, did not make it one of the main accusations against the Bourbon government – far less was spent on all public services: we, with seven million inhabitants, gave away thirty-four million lire, Piedmont, with five [million inhabitants], forty-two [million lire]. The army, which was like the fulcrum of the state, absorbed almost everything; the cities lacked schools, the countryside lacked roads, the beaches lacked landings, and transport was still conducted on the backs of pack animals, as in the plains of the East.

— Giustino Fortunato, Il Mezzogiorno e lo Stato italiano, pp. 336–337

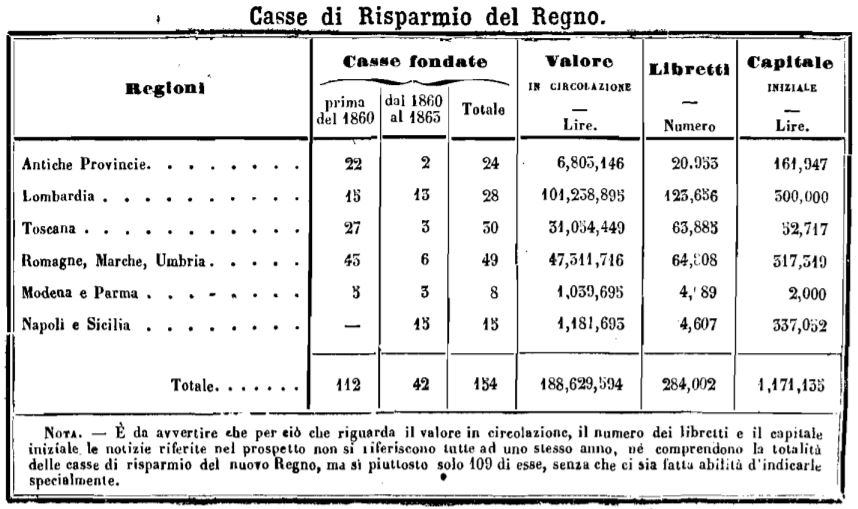
Savings banks in 1861

Fortunato noted what is clearly proven about the budgets of the Bourbon state: expenditure was overwhelmingly directed to the court or the armed forces, charged with protecting the very narrow ruling caste of the kingdom, leaving very little for investment in public works, health and education, and the truly classist nature of Bourbon economic policy is evident from the following figures on state budgets. In 1854, Bourbon government expenditure totalled 31.4 million ducats, of which 1.2 million were spent on education, health and public works, while as much as 14 million ducats were spent on the armed forces and 6.5 million on interest payments on the public debt, in addition to the huge expenditure on the royal court.

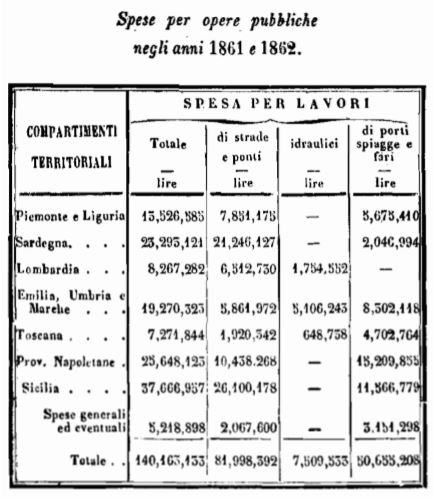
Expenditure on public works in 1861–1862

The budget of the Bourbon state projected for 1860, before Garibaldi's landing in Marsala, in a state of peace and not of war, once again showed the disproportion between military expenditure and expenditure on the population. The planned expenditure, excluding Sicily (which had its own budget), adding up the budget spent directly by the central state (16,250,812 ducats) and that distributed to the local authorities (19,200,000 ducats), for a total of 35,450,812 ducats, was distributed as follows: Army 11,307,220; Navy 3,000,000; Foreign Affairs 298,800; Central Government 1,644,792; Prior debts 13,000,000; Public Works 3,400,000; Clergy and Education 360,000; Police, Justice 2,440,000. Military expenditure accounted for about 40 per cent of the total budget, and if police and judicial expenditure are included, this figure rises to 47 per cent, while expenditure on education and the clergy accounted for only 1 per cent of the total budget of 35,450,812 ducats. Sicily had the last ascertainable budget, expressed in 41,618,200 lire, which at the 1859 exchange rate of 4.25 lire to the ducat was estimated to be equivalent to 9,793,000 ducats. A careful and critical analysis of the financial system of the Bourbons was described in detail by Giovanni Carano Donvito, in which he highlighted how the former Neapolitan government "...although it demanded little of its subjects, it spent very little on them, and what little it did spend, it spent badly...". With the unification of 1861–1862, considerable funds were also allocated to public works in the new Kingdom of Italy, including roads, bridges, harbours, beaches and lighthouses. In the south of the mainland, the works cost 25,648,123 lire, in Sicily 37,218,898 lire and in Sardinia 23,293,121 lire, while the expenditure for Lombardy was 8,267,282 lire and for Tuscany 7,271,844 lire, partly because these areas had already been provided with public works during the previous pre-unitary states.

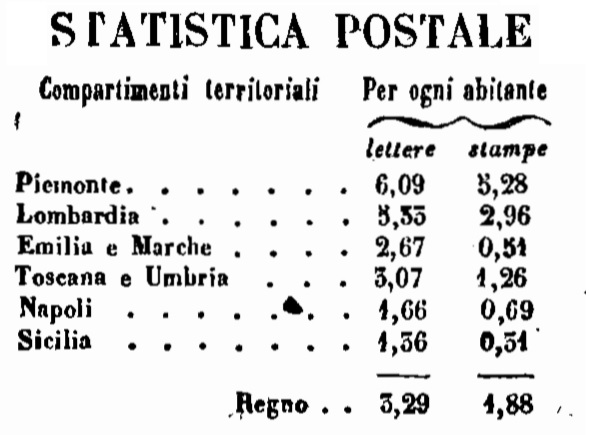
Statistics on letters and prints sent in 1862

Correspondence at the time of the unification of Italy recorded a national average of 3.29 letters and 1.88 prints per inhabitant in 1862, rising to 6.09 letters and 5.28 prints per inhabitant in the Piedmont postal district, 3.07 letters and 1.26 prints per inhabitant in Tuscany and Umbria, and falling further to 1.66 letters and 0.69 prints per inhabitant in the Naples postal district. At the time of the unification, the number of telegraphic dispatches also showed a great disparity: the district of Turin alone recorded an annual income of 747,882 lire, Milan (excluding the unannexed Mantua) 379,253 lire, Bologna 230,340 lire, Pisa 357,127 lire and Cagliari 40,428 lire, while the districts of the former Kingdom of the Two Sicilies recorded annual revenues of 313,889 lire for Naples, 130,405 lire for Foggia, 45,700 lire for Cosenza and 230,701 lire for Palermo. In practice, the district of Turin alone recorded more for telegraphic dispatches (747,882 lire) than the whole of the former Kingdom of the Two Sicilies (720,695 lire). These figures do not take into account the dispatches sent from the 91 offices of the railway companies, which were also open to the public service and private individuals, a fact that increases the number of dispatches sent from the north-central offices, since at that time the railways were largely assigned to the north-central part of the peninsula.

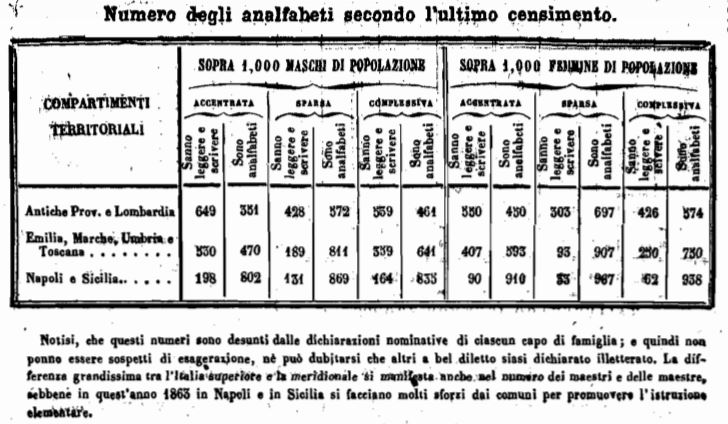
Table of the number of literate and illiterate people in 1861

The scarcity of postal and telegraph traffic in the southern territories was indicative of reduced economic exchanges and low literacy; in fact, in the territories of the former Kingdom of Sardinia and Lombardy, the literate were the majority among men, with 539 literate and 461 illiterate out of 1,000 male inhabitants, while out of 1,000 female inhabitants the literate were 426 and the illiterate 574. Illiteracy tended to increase in the territories of Emilia, Tuscany, Marche and Umbria, where out of 1,000 male inhabitants there were 359 literate and 641 illiterate, while out of 1,000 female inhabitants there were 250 literate and 750 illiterate. In the former Kingdom of the Two Sicilies, the presence of literate people decreased, and out of 1,000 male inhabitants, only 164 were literate and the remaining 835 illiterate, while out of 1,000 female inhabitants, there were only 62 literate and 938 illiterate. The level of secondary education was also generally lower in the southern regions than in the rest of the peninsula. In the south of Italy, in the first years of unification, the damage caused by the insecurity of internal transport due to brigandage was more serious than that caused by liberalism, as was the reduction in demand for goods and services due to the fact that Naples was no longer the capital and that public contracts and state concessions were open to the national market and no longer restricted to the south.

=== Quantitative economic studies ===
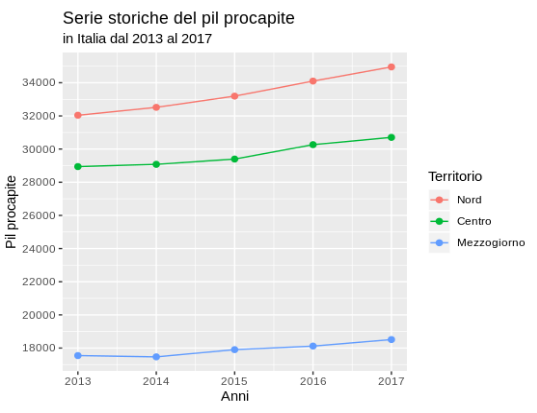
Istat data of GDP per capita for north, centre, and south, 2013–2017

In recent decades, the discussion of economic differences between north and south during unification has been stimulated by the reconstruction of time series of important economic indicators. Research is hampered by the lack of data before 1891, and in particular, the series before 1871 loses its significance due to the upheavals of the previous decade. The reconstruction in which Vittorio Daniele and Paolo Malanima focus on GDP per capita as an indicator of wealth in the various Italian regions, concluding that there were no significant disparities between regions at the time of unification, is particularly influential. Other studies argue to the contrary, such as the work by Emanuele Felice, Perché il Sud è rimasto indietro, Il Mulino, Bologna, pp. 258, 2013.

On the institutional website dedicated to the 150th anniversary of unification, one thesis argues that the north–south divide existed before unification and was caused mainly by the different histories of the two territories, starting with the fall of the Roman Empire, a difference that would have increased from 1300. According to other studies, the difference in per capita income at the time of unification would have been estimated to be 15–20% greater in the north than in the south, a figure derived not only from an analysis of the number of people employed, but also from the size and competitiveness of industrial establishments. Other studies estimate the difference in per capita income to be 25% greater in the north-west than in the south.

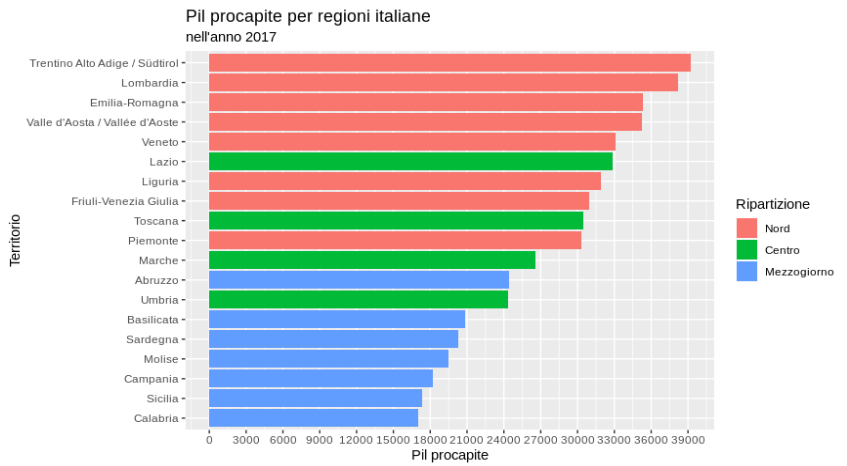
Istat data of GDP per capita by regions, 2017

More recently, Carmine Guerriero and Guilherme de Oliveira have empirically compared the five factors identified by the main theories of the formation of economic differences between northern and southern Italy, namely the democratic nature of pre-unification political institutions, the inequality in the distribution of land ownership and thus in the relationship between elites and farmers, the feudal backwardness of the Kingdom of the Two Sicilies, the regional endowments of raw materials and rail infrastructure, and the public policies implemented by the Kingdom of Italy after unification. Their conclusion is that, regardless of the different econometric methods used, the available data suggest that the main determinant of the current regional disparities can be identified in post-unification public policies, and in particular in the lower property taxes and greater investment in railways and public contracts enjoyed by the regions closest to the borders with Austria and France, which were therefore more important to the Piedmontese elite in military terms.

On the other hand, the view that post-unification policy was primarily determined by the important policies of the "Piedmontese elite" contrasts with the fact that the former Bourbon South was well represented in the elected parliament of unified Italy, with as many as 192 deputies, as opposed to only 72 in the Old Provinces, the name adopted at the time to refer to the continental territory of the former Kingdom of Sardinia. In fact, the parliamentary representation of the post-unification south was numerous and, with its vote, contributed significantly to the approval of laws and the shaping of post-unification policies.

== After the unification of Italy ==
=== Political situation ===
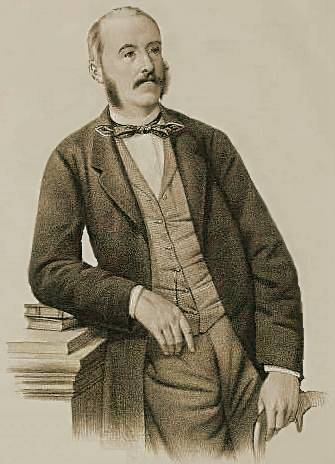
Portrait of Marco Minghetti

In February 1861, the representatives of the unified regions met in Turin for the first time, and a month later, by the grace of God and the will of the nation, they conferred the title of King of Italy on Victor Emmanuel II; however, it was not clear how he would govern. The King and court had been excommunicated because of the invasion of the eastern part of the Papal States, and Catholics were forbidden to participate in political life. Most rulers did not know the south at all, having never travelled further south than Naples or having spent long years in exile as opponents of the Bourbons. They were convinced that the wealth of the south had remained untapped because of past mismanagement and that only the unification of Italy would unlock its hidden riches. They were unaware of the poverty of the countryside and the state of the infrastructure, and this led them, among other things, to impose taxes that exceeded what the territory could pay. Moreover, voting was by census, so southern deputies were more likely to represent the demands of the landowners than those of the people.

Camillo Benso, Count of Cavour's death on 6 June ushered in a series of weak governments, many of which lasted less than a year. There were many problems to solve: eight systems of law, economics, money and even weights and measures had to be unified. This, combined with the irredentism towards the Triveneto, which was still Austrian, and towards Rome and Lazio, which were occupied by a French garrison, created a dangerous temptation to test the forces of the new state in a war against the foreigners. Italian was spoken by an educated minority of the population, and the plebiscites that had sanctioned the unification had been conducted in a highly questionable manner, both in form and in the interference of the authorities that were supposed to supervise them, creating a false sense of consensus far superior to the real one, when many southerners would rather have expressed a need for greater autonomy. Instances in favour of administrative decentralisation, represented by Minister Marco Minghetti were hastily abandoned. On 3 October, continuing what had been done with Lombardy by the Rattazzi Decree-Law of 1859, the decree that had extended Piedmontese legislation to the south on 2 January was converted into law,

The administrative organisations, even the glorious ones, of the pre-unitary states were uncritically erased by promoting a progressive "Piedmontisation" of public administration. The first measures of the new government were aimed at recovering the capital needed to unify the country and provide it with the infrastructure it so desperately needed. Compulsory military service was introduced, and new taxes were introduced, most notably in 1868, when the price of bread rose, which hit the poorer sections of the population. Decisive work was also done to abolish feudal privileges, including the wholesale sale of large tracts of state and church land. The intention was to increase agricultural productivity by distributing land, but in fact, this land went into the hands of landlords who had the capital to buy and maintain it. An irreplaceable resource was thus wasted, with little revenue for the state and the immobilisation of capital that could have produced more wealth if invested in improving the land or in industry. The peasants also suffered because they could no longer use the common land that had previously been available to the various villages. Positive measures were also taken, such as the construction of public works and a new impetus to the development of the railway network, but the effects were slow to be felt. The various laws that sought to establish free and compulsory education, however minimal, proved difficult to implement, especially in the south. In fact, the burden of maintaining primary schools fell on the municipalities, with the result that many southern administrations were unable to meet the necessary costs.

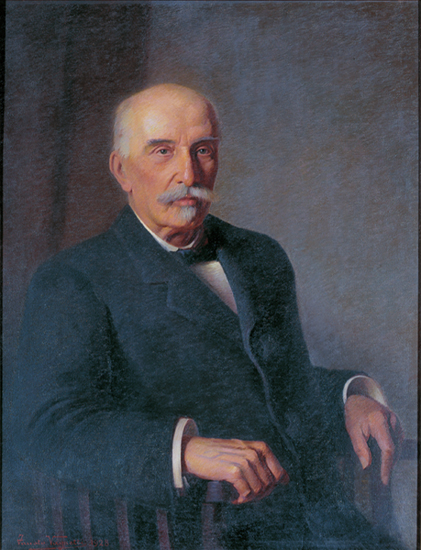
Giovanni Giolitti

It was not until after the Second World War that the use of Italian, as a complement to the various dialects, was witnessed in mass education and on television. Moreover, it was not until the Giolittian Era that the central government showed a first and tentative interest in the south. Although it did not reduce poverty or emigration, at the beginning of the 20th century, it provided the south with public administrations similar to those in the north, which led to the recruitment of a number of civil servants. It was also thanks to the central government that in 1911 the state took over primary education, which had previously been the prerogative of the municipalities. The deterioration in living conditions and the disillusionment with the expectations created by the unification led to a series of popular uprisings in Naples and in the countryside and to the phenomenon known in history as brigandage, to which the new state responded by sending in soldiers and adopting a dirigiste and authoritarian administrative model, in which local autonomies were subject to the strict control of the central government. Vittorio Bachelet spoke of "a certain colonising attitude of the unified administration in some regions", but this "colonising" attitude was never found in the other annexed territories, not even in those of central Italy, which had little in common with Piedmontese culture, being territories far from Piedmont and bordering on the south. In fact, Piedmontese expansionism itself was aimed first and foremost at a state comprising the regions of northern Italy, not at a national state on the scale of the new Italy; a confederation of states was strongly advocated at the time, both in the north and in the south. The annexation of the Kingdom of the Two Sicilies was the result of an extraordinary series of favourable political events.

=== Brigandage ===
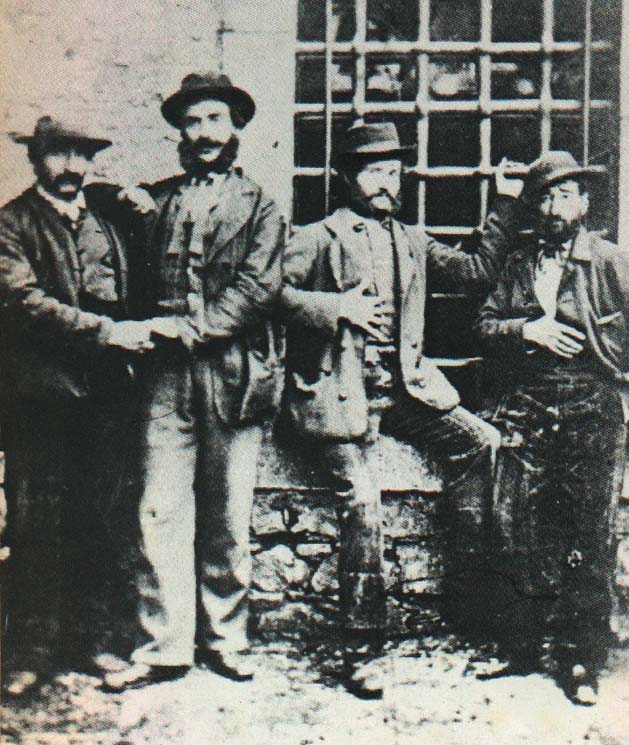
Some Lucanian brigands: Giuseppe Caruso, Cafo, Lamacchia, and Tinna

Brigandage was an endemic phenomenon in the pre-unification south, as explained by Francesco Saverio Nitti:

In every part of Europe there have been bandits and delinquents who, in times of war and misfortune, have dominated the country and set themselves apart from the law ... but there has been only one country in Europe where brigandage has existed, it can be said, from time immemorial ... a country where brigandage for many centuries has been like a river of blood and hate ... a country in which for centuries the monarchy has been based on brigandage, which has become like a historical agent: this country is the south of Italy.

— Francesco Saverio Nitti, Eroi e briganti (1899 ed.), p. 9

The new government failed to meet the expectations of both republicans and some moderates, who had also favoured unity but hoped for a new agrarian order and adequate political space in the running of the country. Many southern workers had hoped that the new regime would guarantee some form of agrarian reform, but their expectations were dashed. According to Tommaso Pedio, the rapid political transformation achieved in the south caused resentment and discontent everywhere, not only from the people and the old Bourbon class, but also from the bourgeoisie and liberals, who demanded to maintain privileges and lucrative positions from the new government. The bourgeoisie class, loyal to the Bourbon crown before 1860, supported the united cause only upon Garibaldi's landing in Sicily. The new Italian state thus decided to privilege the liberals, for fear of antagonizing them, and to use their leading exponents against the aspirations of the radical bands, neglecting the needs of the working classes, for whom, according to Pedio, the recognition and listing of state lands would have sufficed.

The state property issue was not resolved, for Pedio, not only because of the carelessness of the royal government but also because of the opposition of the liberal class, as it would have risked losing the support of the wealthy landowners, whose interests would have been damaged. The lower classes, the only unheard voice, oppressed by hunger, upset by rising taxes and prices on primary goods, and forced into compulsory conscription, began to revolt, developing a deep resentment toward the new regime and especially toward the social strata that took advantage of political events by managing to obtain posts, jobs and new earnings. Bands of brigands formed (many of them from Garibaldi's time in Naples), joined not only by desperate workers but also by former Bourbon soldiers, former Garibaldians, and common bandits. The government of the Two Sicilies in exile seized the opportunity to attempt a reaction to regain the throne, appealing to the people's desperation and resentment of the new order. The desperate people listened to the words of the old regime, were swayed by its proposals, and, hoping for benefits, supported the cause of a Bourbon restoration.

Many clashes had already taken place in various parts of the south since the late 1860s, especially around the Bourbon citadel of Civitella del Tronto, which had been taken over by former Bourbon general Luigi Mezzacapo in 1861. In April, a popular uprising broke out in Basilicata. Throughout the summer, bands of brigands, composed largely of peasants and former Bourbon soldiers, engaged in extremely violent forms of guerrilla warfare in many inland provinces, attacking and repeatedly defeating the forces of the new Kingdom of Italy. The Bourbon flag was raised again in many southern towns. To combat brigands and insurgents, the government passed the Pica Law and responded by ordering summary executions, even of civilians, and the burning of entire villages. The Lieutenant Governor of Naples, Gustavo Ponza di San Martino, who had been trying to bring about peace in the preceding months, was replaced by General Enrico Cialdini, who was given full powers by the central government to deal with the situation and suppress the revolt. The phenomenon took on, according to some scholars, the connotations of a real civil war, which forced the Italian state to employ about 120,000 soldiers to suppress the rebellion in the southern provinces.

It was fought with ferocity on both sides, with the civilian population, as always, bearing the brunt: a situation that repeated itself throughout the duration of the civil war was the looting of a town by rebel groups, followed by the intervention of the army in search of collaborators, which systematically involved a second looting, the destruction of buildings set on fire, summary executions and often the dispersal of the survivors. President Giorgio Napolitano recalled on the occasion of the 150th anniversary of the unification of Italy that "brigandage was eradicated in southern Italy, even if the vital need to defeat this danger of legitimist reaction and national disintegration was paid for by the price of sometimes violent repression in response to the ferocity of brigandage and, in the long run, by the price of a tendency towards foreignness and hostility to the state that would become even more entrenched in the south". On the other hand, there remained the great problem of the legitimist brigandage, which was practically non-existent in the central-northern part of the Italian peninsula, which, like the south, was annexed by force of arms, a fact that Massimo d'Azeglio had already noted in 1861 and which posited the existence of a cultural gap with the Italian state.

... I know nothing about suffrage, I know that on this side of the Tronto [the Tronto river roughly demarcated the border between the former Kingdom of Naples and the Papal States and commonly served as the border territory between northern and southern Italy] battalions are not necessary and that on the other side they are necessary.

— Massimo d'Azeglio, Scritti e discorsi politici, III, pp. 399-400

=== Beginning of southern emigration ===
The great southern emigration began only a few decades after the unification of Italy, where in the first half of the 19th century it had already affected several areas in the north, particularly Piedmont, Comacchio and Veneto. The historical reasons for the first southern emigration in the second half of the 19th century are to be found in widespread literature both in the crisis of the countryside and grain, and in the situation of economic impoverishment affecting the south in the aftermath of unification, when industrial investments were concentrated in the northwest, as well as in other factors. In this regard, the theory of southern emigration linked to the concentration of industrial investment in the northwest does not explain how emigration to central Italy has historically been much lower than that of the south and how the NEC (northeast-centre) has been able to progressively grow from an economic-industrial point of view, approaching the northwest and surpassing it in some cases. Southern emigration is a phenomenon that follows different historical waves of departures and different geographical destinations in different periods. It is a phenomenon that does not stop in the statistics, even in the current period, when emigration is characterized by a significant flow of geographical displacement of graduates and professionals from the south, which can be qualified as intellectual emigration, beyond the normal flows of labour mobility, which further impoverishes the social and cultural substrate of the southern regions.

=== Sonnino-Franchetti inquiry and the discovery of the southern question ===
In 1875, following the deterioration of public order in the southern regions and in Sicily, the government proposed to Parliament the adoption of exceptional measures for public security. During the debate in the Chamber, and while controversies raged in the country, it was decided to make the adoption of the measures conditional on the completion of a study of the economic and social conditions of Sicily, which was entrusted to a group of parliamentarians (from the right and the left) and magistrates and carried out between 1875 and 1876. The results were published and then reprinted several times, even together with the preparatory acts, but were underestimated by public opinion and the political class of the time. In 1877, university professors and members of the historical Right, Leopoldo Franchetti and Sidney Sonnino, partly in response to the "official" inquiry, published their inquiry in Sicily with which they for the first time drew public attention to the harshness of living conditions in some southern regions and the exploitation of Sicilian child labour in the sulphur mines.

=== Colonial venture and trade war with France ===
The emergence of Italy as a unitary state had prompted the pursuit of an aggressive foreign policy on the European chessboard rather than concentrating on resolving internal contradictions. The aftermath of the Third Italian War of Independence, friction over the annexation of the Papal States (the Roman question), and conflicting interests in Tunisia (Slap of Tunis) led Italy to move away from its traditional ally France and closer to Germany and Austria in the Triple Alliance. Already between 1877 and 1887 (the government of Agostino Depretis), Italy had passed new protectionist tariff laws to protect its weak industry. These laws penalized agricultural exports from the south, favoured industrial production concentrated in the north, and created the conditions for the corrupt mixing of politics and economics. According to Giustino Fortunato, these measures determined the final collapse of southern interests in the face of those of northern Italy. In the same vein, Luigi Einaudi argued how the "strong tariff barrier" of the post-unification period ensured northern industries "a monopoly of the southern market, with the consequence of impoverishing agriculture".

=== World War I ===
With the First World War, the relative development of the north, based on industry, was favoured by the war orders, while in the south, the conscription of young men to arms left the fields neglected, depriving their families of all sustenance, since, in the absence of men at the front, southern women were not accustomed to working the land like peasant women in the north and centre, In fact, in the south, the arable land was often far from the homes, which were located in the villages, and even if they had wanted to, southern women would not have been able to do the housework and work the land at the same time, which was possible in northern and central Italy, where the peasants lived in farmhouses just a few meters from the land to be cultivated. At the end of the war, it was the northern entrepreneurial bourgeoisie that benefited from the expansion of markets and from war reparations, in this case partly because the damage of the First World War had been done mainly in the central and eastern part of the country bordering Austria.

=== Fascist period ===
Fascist Italy was interested in broadening its consensus through economic growth that would support its expansionist policy. To this end, it promoted a series of public works through various bodies such as the Institute for Industrial Reconstruction (IRI) and the Italian Securities Institution (IMI) to equip the most impoverished territories in the south with infrastructure. Two ports (Naples and Taranto) were improved, a number of roads, railways and canals were built, the construction of a large aqueduct (that of the Tavoliere delle Puglie) was undertaken, and, above all, an ambitious plan for integral reclamation was devised; however, these were investments that met local needs only to a small extent, with a modest impact on employment and distributed according to criteria aimed at producing or consolidating consensus toward the regime on the part of the populations concerned and, at the same time, not harming the interests of the classes, notably landowners and petty-bourgeoisie, that constituted the hard core of Fascism in the south. This was particularly evident in the implementation of the massive land reclamation plan, where the conflicting interests of the peasants, who demanded a transfer of the reclaimed land to them, and the old landowners, fearful of being expropriated, could not be harmonized. Attempts were made in vain to limit the influence of the latter, and so "reclamation in the South came to a halt at the stage of public works, while all the turmoil that misery and permanent imbalances had caused was channeled in those years into the myth of empire".

The policies implemented in the Fascist era to increase productivity in the primary sector were also unsuccessful: in particular, the agrarian policy pursued by Mussolini deeply damaged certain areas of the south. In fact, production focused mainly on wheat (battle for wheat) at the expense of more specialized and profitable crops that were widespread in the more fertile and developed southern areas. As for industry, it experienced during the "black twenty-year period" a long period of stagnation in the south, which is also noticeable in terms of employment. In fact, those employed in the secondary sector in the south constituted 20 per cent of the national total in 1911, and almost thirty years later, this percentage had not changed significantly. In 1938, industrial workers had dropped to 17.1 per cent, but, taking into account the lower demographic weight of the south and the Islands compared to the other two economic macro-areas of the country at that date, the ratio of these workers to those working in the rest of Italy had remained practically unchanged (in the same time frame, the population of the south had dropped from about 38 percent to about 35.5 percent of the total population of the country).

In the late 1930s, Fascism gave a new impetus to its economic efforts in the south and in Sicily, but this was an initiative aimed at increasing the meagre consensus the regime enjoyed in the south and at popularizing in the south the world war that would soon engulf Italy. Fascist Italy, as a totalitarian state, resorted to means outside the rule of law (torture, special laws) to fight all forms of organized crime in the south. Famous was the appointment of Cesare Mori, later called the "Iron Prefect" for his harsh methods, as Prefect of Palermo with extraordinary powers over the entire island. Despite its excellent results, the Mafia was not completely eradicated, so much so that it allied itself with the Anglo-Americans during the Second World War and had contacts with some members of Fascism itself (see Alfredo Cucco and the Tresca case).

=== World War II ===
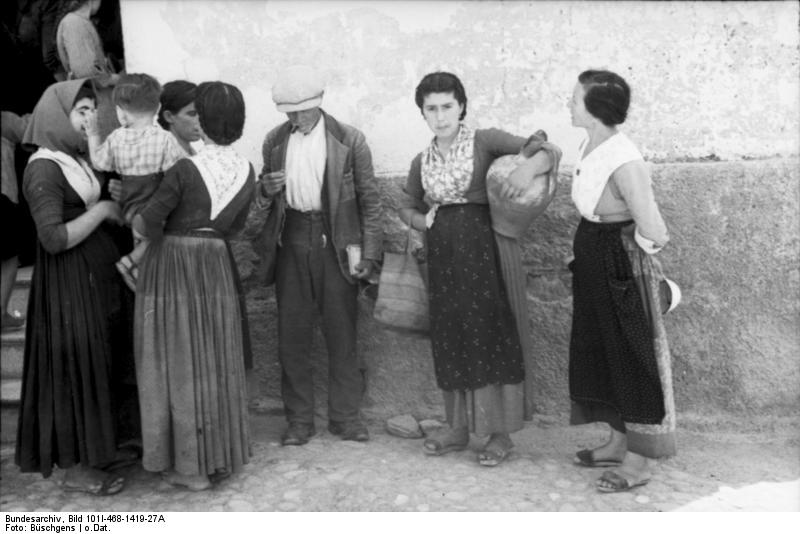
Group of men and women photographed in a town in southern Italy, 1943

In World War II, the disparities were political as well as economic. In 1943, as the Allies prepared to land in Sicily to invade Italy, they found an ally in the Mafia through families operating in the United States, who offered to provide strategic intelligence and moral legitimacy to the invaders in exchange for civilian control of southern Italy. The Allied command agreed, and so the territories they gradually conquered came under the control of the various Mafia clans, which took advantage of this phase to consolidate their power, including militarily. The collapse of the state repressive apparatus was followed by the return of the issue of banditry, especially in Sicily, where some of its exponents joined political independence movements demanding the independence of the island.

The provisional government decided not to repress the movement, which had no social content or demands, but rather to bribe it. Large portions of the Marshall Plan were diverted to areas in turmoil, and the protest was deprived of the active interest of the population. Gang leaders were paid to lay down their arms, and through complex political manoeuvres, some of the remaining gangs were persuaded and paid to carry out attacks against the civilian population, which ended up isolating the armed groups. At the same time, a denigrating press campaign was unleashed against the insurgents. To make matters worse, the new republican constitution granted Sicily a degree of autonomy, depriving the last rebels of any political legitimacy. The few remaining bands were identified and eliminated to the indifference of the population. As had happened eighty years earlier, the Mafia distanced itself from the armed groups and went back into hiding, integrating itself into the population. An integral part of this strategy is the cooperation of ordinary people, especially through omertà, or obstructing law enforcement by hiding or withholding sensitive information.

=== First Republic ===
After the war, the Mafia gained enormous power in some important regions of southern Italy, first in Sicily and then in Calabria and Campania. The southern question was discussed at length in the Constituent Assembly. Precisely to emphasize the national and constitutional dimension of the problem, it was provided in Article 119 of the Constitution that "in order to provide for specific purposes, and in particular to strengthen the south and the islands, the state shall allocate by law to the various regions special contributions." This reference was later removed by Constitutional Revision Act No. 3/2001. At various times, the Italian government allocated funds to the development of the south, even creating a financial institution called the Cassa per il Mezzogiorno to manage the flows. The Mafia, for its part, invested its illegal proceeds in legitimate activities; however, such movements ended up diverting public funds or laundering the proceeds of crime, rather than financing productive enterprises. Public investments were too often misused and were used by large public and private groups in the north to set up industrial plants in areas poorly served by infrastructure, with administrative headquarters often far from the production facilities, but nevertheless taking advantage of the large amounts of public capital allocated there.

Many northern industrial groups were encouraged by public subsidies to establish themselves in the south, but such decisions proved to be uneconomical in some respects, as many of these industrial experiments soon failed when the public subsidies ended. For their part, the large companies that joined these projects and the political parties that promoted them took advantage of the uncomfortable environment in which they operated by resorting to patronage practices in hiring, without ever emphasizing productivity or the value added by business activities. These pernicious practices, called "welfarism", led to a profound change in the laws of the market and to the abortion of any possible economic development of the most depressed areas of the country. Italian private capital avoided the south unless it was encouraged by the allocation of substantial public funds, considering that any investment in a productive sector not subsidized by the state was doomed to failure. Although the situation is very different in the 21st century, patronage attitudes still persist in southern politics, and all too often large public contracts in the south are awarded to the usual large industrial groups.

As for the development of the private economy of the south in the years of the "economic miracle" until the mid-1970s, there was intense and steady economic growth in the south, which finally succeeded (after almost a century) in reversing the trends of the southern economy and bringing it closer to the levels of the north. This turnaround came to an abrupt halt in the early 1970s, after the oil crisis, and from then on the dualism between north and south returned. Since 2000, the data collected showed that the southern economy was slowly narrowing the gap again. When the government found itself taking legislative action or negotiating international agreements in the economic sphere, attention was directed, again, to northern industries. For example, in the 1940s and 1950s, when Italian emigrants, mainly from the south, began to arrive en masse in the coal mines of Belgium, the Italian government requested and received from the Belgian government one ton of coal per year for each emigrant worker; this supply did not benefit the regions of origin of the emigrant miners, but was destined for factories located mainly in the northern areas of the country.

In the 1960s and 1970s, the industrialised areas experienced a period of economic development, centred on the export of finished goods, called the "Italian" miracle. The phenomenon attracted labour from the south, and also affected it for a few decades, but the disparity in the two living standards became evident and widely discussed. In reaction, emigrants sent remittances to their families who remained in the south, and the state finally devoted significant resources to the development of essential services, but these resources were unable to be reinvested in productive circles, and only served to raise, albeit slightly, the living standards of the families of southern emigrants. Beginning in the 1980s, the judiciary sought a new mission and focused on organized crime. Social developments such as individualism and the spectacularisation of public life contributed to conditions in which the system of power used by the ruling class began to show cracks. Various laws strengthened the fight against corruption and crime: one that confirmed the separation of the judiciary from the executive, another that established reduced sentences and other benefits for defendants who cooperated with ongoing investigations, and finally one that made membership in a mafia association a more serious crime than simple criminal association. All of this allowed some progress to be made in the 1980s in the fight against the Mafia.

=== Contemporary south ===
During this period, a partial consolidation of the public debt accumulated by previous administrations was undertaken, accompanied by a reduction and rationalisation of public spending. The European Union partially accompanies this process by financing entrepreneurial projects of a social, ecological or cultural nature, but these initiatives are not of such a nature as to create self-financing mechanisms, and the benefits derived are very small. In this respect, Abruzzo, unlike all the other regions of the south, was excluded from the Objective 1, which subsequently expired.

As a result of the abolition of the Cassa per il Mezzogiorno, the south benefits from Invitalia and sometimes from tax breaks for hiring young people, through rebates, bonuses and deductions to encourage employment in companies located in southern Italy. The Svimez and Formez institutes also exist to follow issues related to the south of Italy. In absolute terms, the economic situation of the south has undoubtedly improved over the past sixty years; in relative terms, the gap with the north drastically increased since the 1970s.

Studies from the January 2020 Eurispes report show how, from 2000 to 2007, the eight southern regions occupied the lowest places in the ranking by distribution of public spending. On the other hand, all the northern Italian regions have been showered by the state with an amount of annual expenditure significantly higher than the national average. If, from the total public expenditure, one considers the share that the south should have received each year as a percentage of its population, it emerges that, in total, from 2000 to 2017, the corresponding sum subtracted from it amounts to more than 840 billion euros net (on average, about 46.7 billion euros per year).

Even into the 2020s, various structural problems continue to hamper the region's chances for economic progress: the lack of infrastructure, the presence of a banking system that is not very attentive to the needs of the territory (the old large southern banks have been gradually incorporated into large northern groups since the 1990s, such as the Banco di Napoli), the delays of an often plethoric public administration, the emigration of many young people who cannot find work because of the limited economic growth, and above all the infiltration of the organized underworld into the political and economic life of the south, a factor that is the main brake on the economic growth of the south.

== Studies ==
=== Sociocultural aspects ===
The question of the south is not limited to the difference in economic development between the north and the south, as the gap also extends to many socio-cultural aspects, as measured by Istat data, which represent the most diverse social issues and behaviours on the peninsula. Giustino Fortunato noted that in addition to the economic field, "there was also a profound diversity between customs, traditions, the intellectual and moral world". Even the writer Giuseppe Tomasi di Lampedusa, in his novel The Leopard, describes the different Sicilian and southern cultural attitudes towards the changes brought about by the unification of Italy.

Following unification, a saying in the north emerged that Giuseppe Garibaldi "did not unite Italy, he divided Africa". This saying became picked up by some members of the Lega Nord party.

=== Historiographical debate ===
The southern question has been the subject of multiple studies over time, with non-convergent conclusions, and is still a source of heated debate among historians, economists, and politicians. In the 2010s, economic researches pointed to the emergence of the southern question in the final part of the 19th century; however, even Marxist Antonio Gramsci, although critical of the Italian state, attributed the existence of the gap, as early as 1860, mainly due to the many centuries of different history of the north of the peninsula compared to the south, defined as two "antithetical" sections, which came together after 1,000 years, as Gramsci himself points out in his work The Southern Question: The South and the War (1, p. 5).

On the other hand, the abundant literature of the period immediately following the Expedition of the Thousand shows a fierce opposition to the methods used by the Kingdom of Savoy to manage the annexation of the Kingdom of the Two Sicilies, and even the burgeoning emergence of southern music shows how alive was already in 1868 a fierce satire against the newly formed Kingdom. Examples are the songs Palummella zompa e vola, a nostalgic song for the lost freedom of the southern kingdom, or the carnival song Italiella. The revisionist thesis, which would see the south as hostile to the Savoyards after unification, does not explain the fact that, during the 1946 Italian institutional referendum, it was the south that voted overwhelmingly in favour of the Savoy monarchy, while the north voted for the Republic; moreover, from 1946 to 1972 the monarchist parties, later merged into the Italian Democratic Party of Monarchist Unity (PDIUM), still gained support especially in the south and in Naples, where, on the occasion of the 1946 referendum, several Neapolitan citizens died in Via Medina, during the clashes in defense of the Savoy monarchy, events known as the Via Medina massacre.

The main historiographical approaches can be distinguished, which trace in broad strokes broader ideological and political debates:

- Classical historiography, so called because it was originated earlier, proposed the south as a sign of an atypical or delayed evolution, where other conditions would have allowed the region to successfully fit into a dynamic of growth and integration. In this context, the emphasis is placed on the thesis that the north–south divide pre-dates unification and was mainly caused by the different histories of the two territories, beginning with the fall of the Roman Empire, a difference that became more pronounced after 1300.
- Modern historiography, so called because it has been proposed since Gramsci and Salvemini, sees the persistence of misery as an essential component of capitalism, which is based on the dualities of exploiters and exploited, development and underdevelopment, also on a geographical basis.
- The deterministic interpretation, which sees demography (through racist theses) or the geography of the south as the often insurmountable cause of the poverty in which the south finds itself.

Many intellectuals—including those already mentioned, such as Gramsci and Giustino Fortunato—publicly acknowledged the existence of a real southern question, but also claimed that it was due to the unequal treatment between northern Italy and southern Italy, the latter being exploited to an unimaginable extent, to the point that a large part of its children emigrated, leaving their homeland to seek their fortune abroad. Revisionist historiography supports the thesis of the exploitation of the south to the advantage of the north, in particular the fact that, the so-called "Turin-Milan-Genoa" industrial triangle would have developed economically by taking resources away from the south, without explaining how the provinces of northeastern and central Italy, while not receiving aid, have developed economically over time close to and, in several cases, even greater than some of the industrial areas of the aforementioned "Turin-Milan-Genoa" industrial triangle, as shown by the Unioncamere, as well as by Istat data.

In particular, revisionist historiography does not explain the economic development of the regions belonging to the former Papal States, an absolute theocratic anti-liberal monarchy and thus a profoundly different state from the Kingdom of Sardinia, where after 1860 there were no episodes of brigandage or anti-Savoyard revolts, with the former papal populations soon adapting to the new and profoundly different norms of the unified Italian state, growing slowly but progressively until reaching in the last decades of the 20th century, an economic-productive development close to several northern provinces of the Po Valley and in some cases, even greater, as shown by the Istat and Unioncamere data. The topic "The Southern Question", introduced in the epigraph with a famous statement by the southern historian and politician Giustino Fortunato, can also be historically understood by quoting the famous phrase of the Turin politician and patriot Massimo d'Azeglio:

... I know nothing about suffrage, I know that on this side of the Tronto battalions are not necessary and that on the other side they are necessary.

— Massimo d'Azeglio, Scritti e discorsi politici, III, pp. 399–400

=== Historical research ===
Estimated number of emigrants in the periods 1876–1900 and 1901–1915 by region of origin

According to Nitti's reconstructions, the kingdom's substantial wealth, in addition to contributing preponderantly to the formation of the national treasury, was destined mainly to the rehabilitation of the finances of northern regions compromised by the disproportionate public expenditure incurred by the Kingdom of Sardinia in those years, that is, to the development of the provinces of the "industrial triangle". The Piedmontese public debt grew in the decade prior to 1860 by 565 percent, producing as an effect an increase in taxes (23 new taxes were introduced in the Sardinian states in the 1850s), the sale of state property (such as the Sampierdarena steel plant) and the need to take out large loans, thus putting the fortunes of the Savoy state back into the hands of a few large bankers (such as the Rothschilds). On the contrary, in the Bourbon state, as reported by Giacomo Savarese (Minister and Councillor of State in 1848), the public debt corresponded to 16.57 percent of GDP and there were only 5 taxes through which the public rents in those years increased from 16 million to 30 million ducats "as a result of the growth of the general wealth".

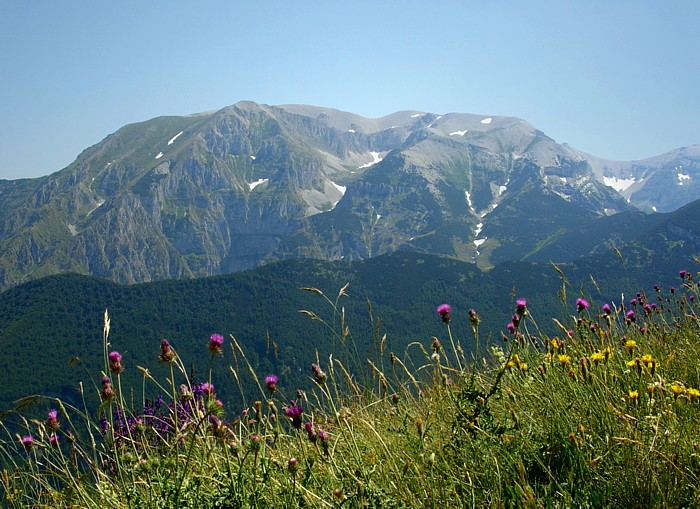
After the unification, the Maiella was the scene of fierce clashes between the Savoy troops and the Loyalists, who also built fortifications ("Blockhaus") on its peaks.

According to the journalist, writer and essayist Paolo Mieli, from the work by Vittorio Daniele and Paolo Malanima, Il divario Nord-Sud in Italia 1861-2011 (Rubbettino), it can be seen that in the years of unification the territories of the Kingdom of the Bourbons had economic conditions quite similar to those of the northern areas and that the GDP per capita of the south was even higher, albeit slightly, than that of northern Italy. In the years following the unification, major public works were carried out in the south, including the improvement of the already poor southern road network and, in particular, the construction of a railway network, which before 1860 was limited to about 100 km around Naples. The total cost of these works was very high, as shown in history of rail transport in Italy. Into the 2010s, research showed that before the unification there were no substantial economic differences between the south and the north in terms of per capita product and industrialisation, although there were serious critical issues in the social indicators of the south (education, life expectancy, and poverty) due to the general backwardness of the southern territory and the rest of rural Italy. Other authors have been critical of the thesis that there were no substantial economic differences between the north and the south at the time of unification. According to other studies at the time of unification, the difference in per capita income was estimated to be 15–20% greater in the north than in the south, a figure derived not only from an analysis of the number of people employed, but also of the size and competitive capacity of industrial establishments. Other studies estimate the difference in per capita income to be 25% greater in the northwest than in the south.

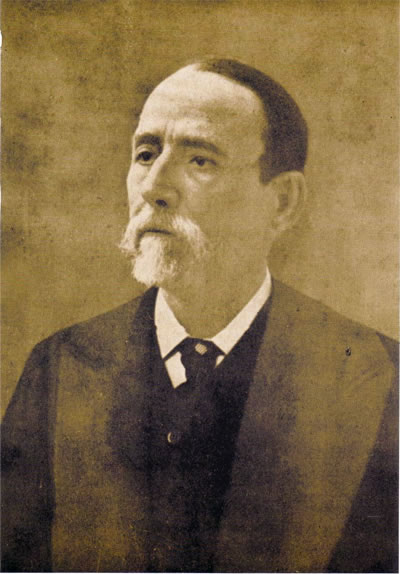
Giustino Fortunato

The actual economic gap began to deepen in the last years of the 19th century, widening from that time onward to create the current dualism between the north-centre and the south, as was highlighted at that very time by southern politicians and scholars such as Sidney Sonnino, Giustino Fortunato, Gaetano Salvemini, Guido Dorso, Francesco Saverio Nitti, and Antonio Gramsci. The economic hardships and disappointed hopes of the southern proletariat in the years following the unification of Italy were at the origin of the armed struggle that inflamed the countryside of the former Bourbon kingdom, referred to as the "brigandage struggle". Poverty also led to the formation of a massive migratory flow, absent in pre-unification times. The economic decline of the south also became perceptible because of the different proportions that the migratory flow assumed between the various parts of the country: if in the period 1876–1900, out of a total of 5,257,911 expatriates, most of the emigrants abroad were inhabitants of the central-northern regions (70.8 percent left from the central-north and 29.2 percent from the central-south), in the period 1900–1915, out of a total of 8,769,785 exiles, the trend reversed and the migratory supremacy passed to the southern regions, with a reduction in northern emigrants and a growth in those from the south (52.7 percent left from the centre-north and 47.3 percent from the centre-south): in particular, out of less than nine million emigrants, almost three million came from Campania, Calabria and Sicily.

Although Fortunato was highly critical of Bourbon policies and an ardent supporter of national unity, he argued that the greatest damage inflicted on the economy of the south after the unification of Italy was caused by the protectionist policy adopted by the Italian state in 1877 and 1887, which he said resulted in "the fatal sacrifice of the interests of the south" and "the exclusive patronage of those of the north", as it crystallized the economic monopoly of the north on the Italian market. Supporting this thesis are the studies conducted by Italian agricultural historian Emilio Sereni, who identified the origin of the southern question in the economic contrast between north and south that came about as a result of the unification of Italian markets in the years immediately following the military conquest of the realm, stating: "The South became, for the new Kingdom of Italy, one of those Nebenlander (dependent territories), of which Marx speaks in regard to Ireland vis-à-vis England, where industrial capitalist development was abruptly crushed for the profit of the dominant country."

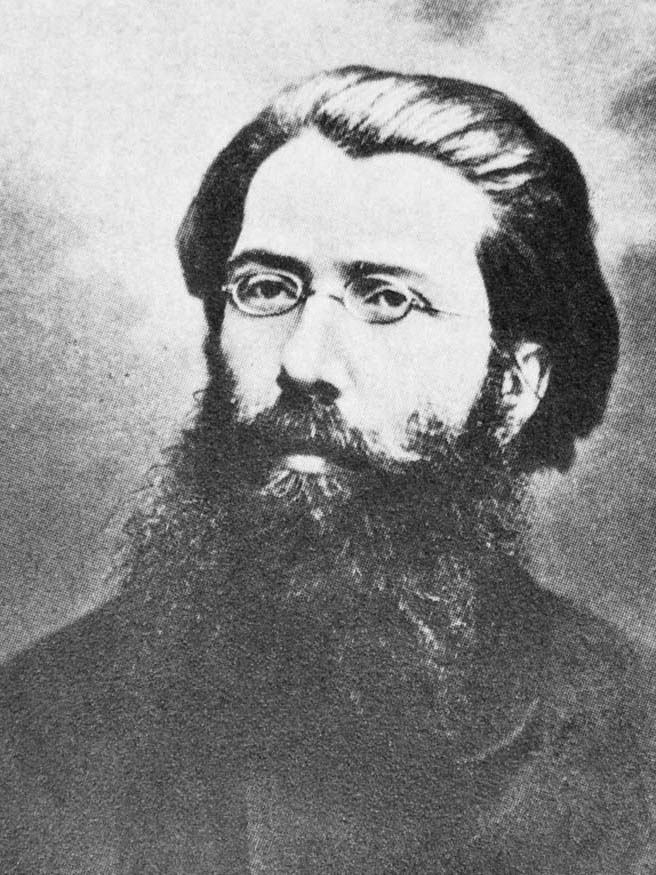
Carlo Cafiero

Gradually, the manufactures and factories of the south declined: local industry succumbed under the combined blows of foreign industry and especially northern industry, which, due to protectionist policies, was put by the governments of the time in the optimal conditions to be able to gain a monopoly on the national market. The south was thus set on a process of agrarisation, and the mass of labour that workers and peasant populations employed in other times in industry-related work remained unused, causing not only an industrial but also an agrarian marasmus. While in the countryside the discontent of the peasant masses took the path of legitimist claim, in the industrial centres of the old kingdom, the emergence of socialist and anarchist nuclei occurred in those years (the first Italian sections to join the First International were established in Naples and Castellammare a few months after the organisation's birth in London), to which workers and young intellectuals of bourgeois backgrounds (such as Carlo Cafiero, Emilio Covelli, Francesco Saverio Merlino, Errico Malatesta, and Antonio Labriola) joined.

This process occurred gradually during the first decades of the Kingdom of Italy's existence, and by 1880, Italian industry was already largely concentrated in the industrial triangle. The southern question emerged during the process of forming and settling the national market. It, with its original vices, acquired increasing acuity in the course of the capitalist development of the Italian economy, becoming complicated by new social and political factors. The theory of the development of the north to the detriment of the south, in particular the fact that, the "Turin-Milan-Genoa" industrial triangle would have developed economically by taking resources away from the south, does not explain how the provinces in the northeast and central Italy, even without receiving aid, developed over time economically close to and, in several cases, even higher than some of the industrial areas in the aforementioned "Turin-Milan-Genoa" industrial triangle as shown by the Unioncamere and Istat data. Classical historiography supports the thesis that the north–south divide existed before unification and was caused mainly by the different histories of the two territories since the fall of the Roman Empire, a difference that would have widened by 1300. The infrastructure and industrial gap in 1860–1861 was as follows:

- Road network: in 1860, the road network in the north-centre was estimated at 75,500 km compared to 14,700 km in the south and islands, for a corresponding density of 626 km per 1,000 km^{2} in the north-centre compared to only 108 km in the south.
- Iron and steel industry: in 1860, the entire Italian iron and steel industry produced 18,500 tons of ironworks, of which 17,000 were produced in the north and only 1,500 in the south.
- The railway network: in 1861, out of the 2,500 km of existing railways, 869 were in Piedmont, 756 in Lombardy-Veneto, 361 in Tuscany, while in the Kingdom of the Two Sicilies, only 184 km were in operation around Naples, with the rest of the south totally devoid of railway tracks.

The existence of the north–south economic-productive gap prior to 1860 is attested by other authors. Carlo Afan de Rivera, an important official in the Bourbon administration, with his "Considerations on the means to restore the proper value to the gifts that nature has largely bestowed on the Kingdom of the Two Sicilies", describes the situation of agriculture in the pre-unification south and the great economic backwardness at the beginning with which the south of Italy found itself at the time of unification. As a Marxist thiker, Gramsci, while critical of the Savoy governments, also attributed the emergence of the southern question mainly to the many centuries of different history of southern Italy, compared to the history of northern Italy.

The new Italy found the two parts of the peninsula, the south and the north, reunited after more than a thousand years in completely opposite conditions.

The Lombard invasion had finally broken the unity created by Rome, and in the north the communes had given history one particular impulse, while in the south the Swabian, Anjou, Spanish and Bourbon domination had given it another.
On the one hand, the tradition of a certain autonomy had created a bourgeoisie that was bold and full of initiative, and there was an economic organisation similar to that of the other states of Europe, conducive to the further development of capitalism and industry.
In the other, the paternalist administrations of Spain and the Bourbons had created nothing: the bourgeoisie did not exist, agriculture was primitive and not even sufficient to satisfy the local market; there were no roads, no ports, no exploitation of the few waters that the region possessed due to its peculiar geological conformation.

The unification brought the two parts of the peninsula into close contact.

— Antonio Gramsci, La questione meridionale, p. 5

American political scientist Edward C. Banfield (1916–1999) argued in his book The Moral Basis of a Backward Society (1958) that the backwardness of the south was due to what he called "amoral familism", a type of society based on an extreme conception of family ties, to the detriment of the ability to associate and the collective interest. American political scientist Robert D. Putnam proposes theses similar to those of Edward C. Banfield in his book The Civic Tradition in the Italian Regions, arguing how the lack of civic sense produces negative effects towards the development and efficiency of institutions and therefore how regions with little civic sense are more backward, even economically, than regions with more civic sense.

=== Scholars of the phenomenon ===
Various scholars and politicians addressed the southern question, looking for the causes of the South's problems. The following are the most prominent:

- Giuseppe Massari (1821–1884) and Stefano Castagnola (1825–1891) were two Italian deputies who headed a parliamentary commission of inquiry into brigandage between 1862 and 1863. Although their work was partial and purely descriptive, it showed how misery played a key role in the birth of the revolt.

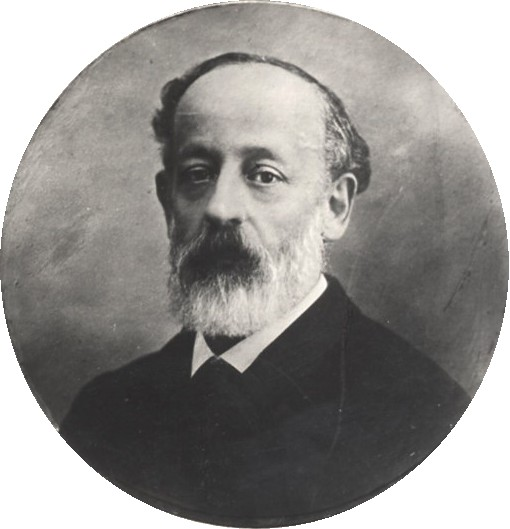
Pasquale Villari

- Pasquale Villari (1827–1917) was among the first to raise the issue of the southern question. He drew attention to the crisis in the south and, in particular, to the weakness of the institutions of the new Italian state in the southern regions. He criticised the workings of the newly unified state because, in order to achieve a balanced budget, it imposed unfair taxation on the popular class, which was one of the main causes of the agrarian proletarian insurrection. Villari believed that the southern question could be healed by bringing the government closer to the southern plebs.

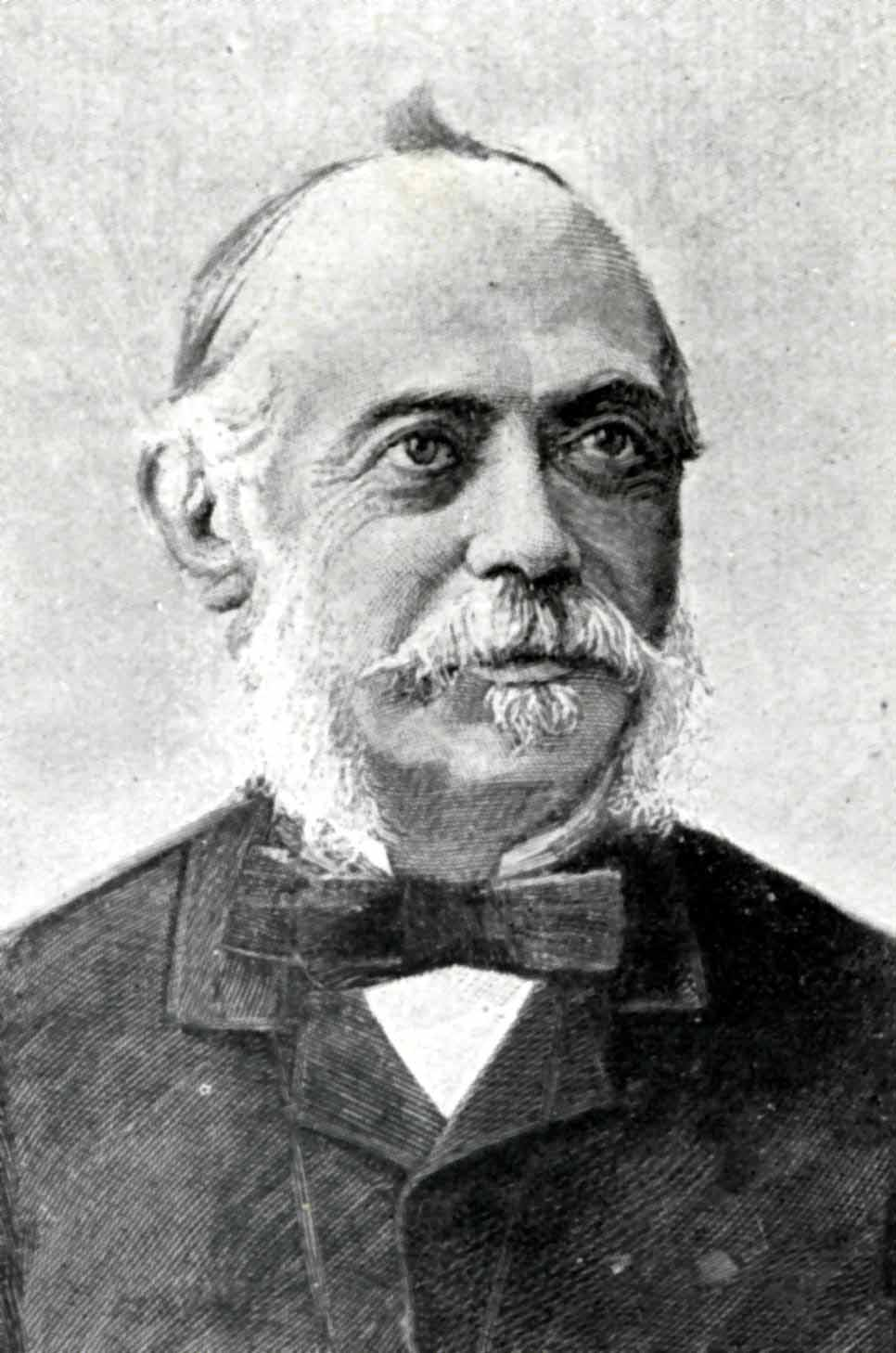
Stefano Jacini

- Stefano Jacini Sr. (1827–1891), longtime minister of public works, was interested in the need to build infrastructure and create a class of small landowners.
- Stefano Jacini Jr. (1886–1952), his grandson, noted two generations later that the situation had not changed, and took up the same views.

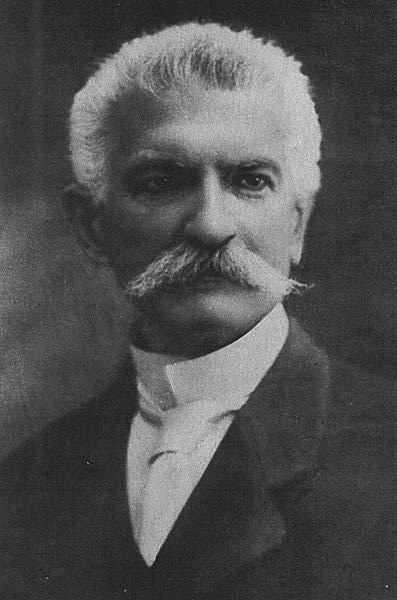
Sidney Sonnino

- Leopoldo Franchetti (1847–1917), Sidney Sonnino (1847–1922), and Enea Cavalieri (1848–1929) produced a famous and well-documented study of the southern question in 1876, highlighting the links between the persistence of illiteracy and latifundia, the absence of a local bourgeoisie, corruption and the Mafia, the need for agrarian reform and the slow development of port, rail and road infrastructure.

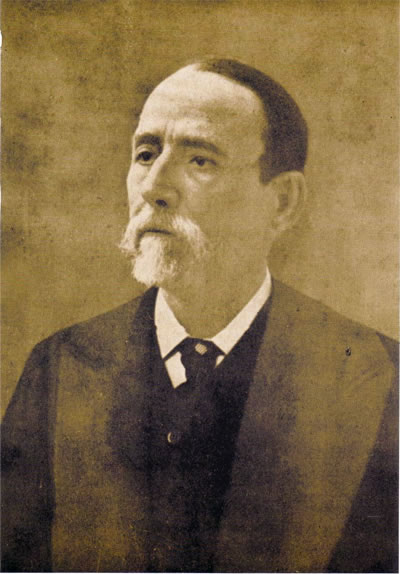
Giustino Fortunato

- Giustino Fortunato (1848–1932), a conservative politician, carried out several studies on the subject, the most famous of which was published in 1879, in which he outlined the physical and geographical disadvantages of the south, the problems of land ownership and the role of conquest in the emergence of brigandage. He was decidedly hostile to any form of federalism, and although he defended the need to redistribute land and fund essential services such as schools and hospitals, he has been seen by some commentators as pessimistic because of his distrust of the southerners' ability to overcome the economic and historical constraints of the south by their own efforts. He expected the north to help the south, but in time became disillusioned by the inability of the northern ruling classes (and more generally of the new Italy) to resolve the southern question.
- Benedetto Croce (1866–1952), a historicist philosopher, reviewed the vicissitudes of the south from the proclamation of the Kingdom of Italy to the 20th century from a historiographical point of view, stressing the impartiality of the sources. His thought differed in part from that of his friend Giustino Fortunato with regard to the importance of natural conditions in the problems of the south. In fact, he considered the ethico-political events that had led to this situation to be fundamental. Both considered the ability of the political and economic classes, national and local, to address and resolve the problem as fundamental. His Storia del Regno di Napoli (History of the Kingdom of Naples), published in 1923, remains the essential point of reference for subsequent historiography, for students and critics alike.

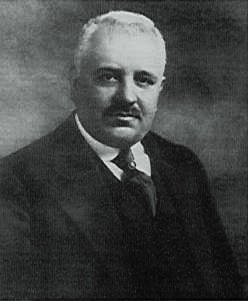
Francesco Saverio Nitti

- Francesco Saverio Nitti (1868–1953), a minister on several occasions, devoted much time to studying the southern economy. Contrary to the majority of Meridionalists, who saw a south oppressed by the Bourbon regime, he believed that the south was not in an extremely serious situation before the unification. He criticised the conservative economic model of the Kingdom of the Two Sicilies, which, in his opinion, prevented the south from following the modern age but guaranteed a mediocre prosperity that was lost after the unification, and praised its administrative and financial arrangements. Nitti analysed the timid industrial development, emigration and urged the creation of an early welfare state. After the Second World War, he also proposed a vast programme of public works, irrigation and reforestation and, like others before him, reiterated the urgency of agrarian reform.

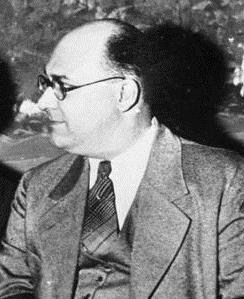
Gaetano Salvemini

- Gaetano Salvemini (1873–1957), a socialist historian and politician, focused his analysis on the disadvantages that the south had inherited from history, sharply criticising the centralised administration of the country and pointing to the need for an alliance between northern workers and southern peasants; however, the systematic exploitation of the south by the northern capital and the adoption of a state legislation particularly punitive towards the south had been made possible, according to Salvemini, by the complicity of the southern landowners and their allies, the local petty bourgeoisie. The latter, vulgar and idle, aroused the contempt of Salvemini, who, on the other hand, had a deep respect for the sober, hard-working and dignified southern peasants. As late as 1952, Salvemini stressed the serious responsibility that the southern petty bourgeoisie had borne and continues to bear for the failure to develop the south, but "the southern bourgeoisie prefers to remain ignorant of this responsibility. They find it convenient to blame the north. Well, we southerners must always point out this responsibility. We must prevent the southerners from forgetting themselves in order to do nothing but rail against the northerners".

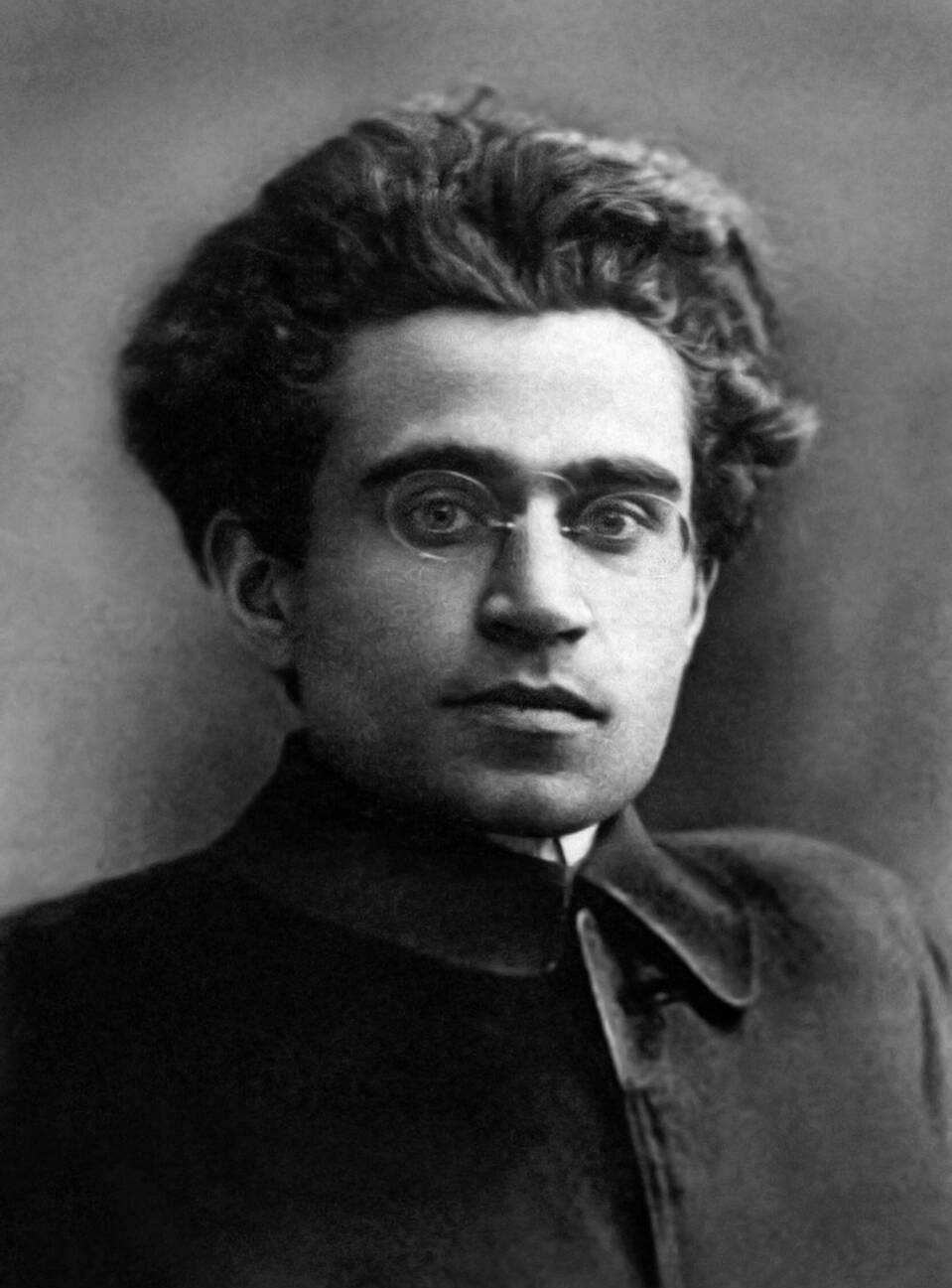
Antonio Gramsci

- Antonio Gramsci (1891–1937), a renowned Marxist thinker, read the backwardness of the south through the prism of class struggle. He studied the mechanisms at work in the peasant revolts of the late 19th century to the 1920s, explained how the working class had been divided from the agricultural labourers by the protectionist measures adopted under fascism, and how the state had artificially invented a middle class in the south through public employment. He hoped for the political maturation of the peasantry, abandoning revolt as an end in itself in favour of a vindictive and proactive stance, and for a more radical turn by the urban proletarians to include the countryside in their struggles. The Marxist Antonio Gramsci attributed the emergence of the southern question mainly to the centuries-old difference in the history of southern Italy compared to northern Italy, as Gramsci himself points out in his work The Southern Question: The South and the War (1, p. 5), pointing to the existence of a profound socio-economic difference between the north-central and southern parts of the Italian peninsula as early as 1860, and also highlighting the serious shortcomings of the previous Spanish and Bourbon administrations.
- Guido Dorso (1892–1947) was an intellectual who defended the dignity of southern culture and denounced the wrongs committed by the north, especially by the political parties. He made exhaustive studies on the evolution of the economy of the south from unification until the 1930s and defended the need for the emergence of a local ruling class.
- Rosario Romeo (1924–1987), historian and politician, opposed revolutionary theories and highlighted the differences that existed between Sicily and the rest of the south before and after the Risorgimento. He attributed the problems of the south to cultural traits characterised by individualism and a lack of civic spirit, rather than to historical or structural causes.
- Paolo Sylos Labini (1920–2005), professor and economist, argued that the lack of civic and cultural development was at the root of the economic divide. He saw corruption and crime as endemic to southern society and welfare as the main obstacle to development.
- Edward C. Banfield (1916–1999) American political scientist who argued that the backwardness of the south was due to amoral familism, a type of society based on an extreme conception of family ties that was detrimental to the ability to associate and the collective interest, explained in his 1958 book The Moral Basis of a Backward Society.
- Luciano Cafagna (1926–2012), an economic historian, outlined some of the reasons why the thesis of northern Italy's economic development at the expense of southern Italy is unfounded.

== See also ==
- Expedition of the Thousand
- Italian economic miracle
- House of Bourbon-Two Sicilies
- Post-unification Italian brigandage

== Bibliography ==
- Annuario statistico italiano - Anno 1864 (PDF), a cura di Cesare Correnti e Pietro Maestri, Tipografia Letteraria, Torino, 1864
- Carlo Alianello, La conquista del Sud, Milano, Rusconi, 1972.
- Edward C. Banfield (1976). Le basi morali di una società arretrata. Bologna: Il Mulino.
- Francesco Barbagallo,Mezzogiorno e questione meridionale (1860–1980), Napoli, Guida Editori, 1980.
- Giovanni Bursotti (1845). Biblioteca di Commercio, Anno II, vol. III. Napoli.
- Renato Brunetta, Sud: un sogno possibile, Roma, 2009. ISBN 978-88-6036-445-6.
- Luciano Cafagna, Dualismo e sviluppo nella storia d'Italia, Venezia, Marsilio, 1989.
- Angelo Calemme, archived from the original on 12 March 2018, Il popolo dei Mezzogiorni Uniti e l'Europa di Maastricht , Salerno, EdiSud Salerno, 2018.
- Giovanni Carano Donvito (1928). L'economia meridionale prima e dopo il Risorgimento. Firenze: Vallecchi.
- Sabino Cassese, Questione amministrativa e questione meridionale. Dimensioni e reclutamento della burocrazia dall'Unità ad oggi, Milano, Giuffrè, 1977, pp. 1–150.
- Raffaele de Cesare (1900). La fine di un Regno. Città di Castello (PG): S. Lapi.
- Guilherme de Oliveira Martins, Carmine Guerriero, "Extractive States: The Case of the Italian Unification", International Review of Law and Economics, 56 (2018) pp. 142–159.
- Carlo Afan de Rivera, Considerazioni su i mezzi da restituire il valore proprio ai doni che la natura ha largamente conceduto al Regno delle Due Sicilie, Napoli, 1832, II, pp. 35–38, 40–45, 52-55. Reproduced in Denis Mack Smith, Il risorgimento italiano. Storia e testi, Bari, Laterza, 1968, pp. 152–155.
- Luigi De Rosa, La provincia subordinata. Saggio sulla questione meridionale, Bari, Laterza, 2004. ISBN 88-420-7194-3
- Mario Di Gianfrancesco (1979). La rivoluzione dei trasporti in Italia nell'età risorgimentale. L'unificazione del mercato e la crisi del Mezzogiorno. L'Aquila: Japadre.
- Emanuele Felice, Divari regionali e intervento pubblico. Per una rilettura dello sviluppo in Italia, Bologna, il Mulino, 2007. ISBN 9788815118820
- Giustino Fortunato, Il Mezzogiorno e lo Stato italiano, Firenze, 1973.
- Leopoldo Franchetti, Sidney Sonnino, La Sicilia nel 1876, Firenze, Vallecchi, 1925.
- Antonio Gramsci, La questione meridionale, Roma, 1966.
- Giordano Bruno Guerri, Il Sangue del Sud. Antistoria del Risorgimento e del Brigantaggio, Milano, Arnoldo Mondadori Editore, Milano, 2010.
- Giuseppe Ladanza, Della questione meridionale, in L'esperienza meridionalistica di Ottieri, pp. 63–104, Bulzoni, Roma, 1976.
- N. Moe, The View from Vesuvius. Italian culture and the southern question, University of California Press, Berkeley-Los Angeles-London, 2006.
- Emanuele Felice, Perché il Sud è rimasto indietro, Il Mulino, Bologna, pagg. 258, 2013.
- Amedeo Lepore, La questione meridionale prima dell'intervento straordinario, Piero Lacaita Editore, Manduria-Bari-Roma, 1991.
- Francesco Saverio Nitti, Napoli e la questione meridionale, Bari, 1958.
- Orizzonti Meridiani, a cura di Briganti o emigranti. Sud e movimenti fra conricerca e studi subalterni, pref. F. Piperno, Ombre Corte, Verona, 2015 (2013).
- Ernesto Paolozzi, Il liberalismo democratico e la questione meridionale, Napoli, 1990.
- Guido Pescosolido,La questione meridionale in breve, Roma, Donzelli, 2017.
- Cosimo Perrotta e Claudio Sunna (2012). L'arretratezza del Mezzogiorno, - Le idee, l'economia, la storia. Milano: Bruno Mondadori.
- Robert D. Putnam (1993). La tradizione civica nelle regioni italiane. Milano: Mondadori.
- Antonio Russo, Governare lo sviluppo locale, Roma, 2009. (Capitolo sulla ricostruzione storica della questione meridionale e dell'intervento straordinario per il Mezzogiorno).
- Giovanni Russo, Baroni e contadini, Bari, La Terza, 1955.
- Alfonso Scirocco (1993). L'Italia del Risorgimento. Bologna: Il Mulino.
- Giovanni Vecchi, In ricchezza e in povertà: il benessere degli italiani dall'unità a oggi, Bologna, Il mulino, 2011. ISBN 8815149309.
- Daniele Vittorio; Paolo Malanima (2011). Il divario nord-sud in Italia, 1861-2011. Rubbettino Editore.
- Edmondo Maria Capecelatro, Antonio Carlo, Contro la questione meridionale. Studio sulle origini dello sviluppo capitalistico in Italia, Roma, Savelli Editore, 1975.
- Busetta, Pietro (2021). Il lupo e l'agnello: dal mantra del Sud assistito all'operazione verità (in Italian). Soveria Mannelli: Rubbettino. OCLC 1277195334.
- Pietro Busetta (2018). Il coccodrillo si è affogato: Mezzogiorno, cronache di un fallimento annunciato e di una possibile rinascita (in Italian). Soveria Mannelli: Rubbettino. OCLC 1041510099.
