= Emanuele Felice =

Italian economist and historian, public figure

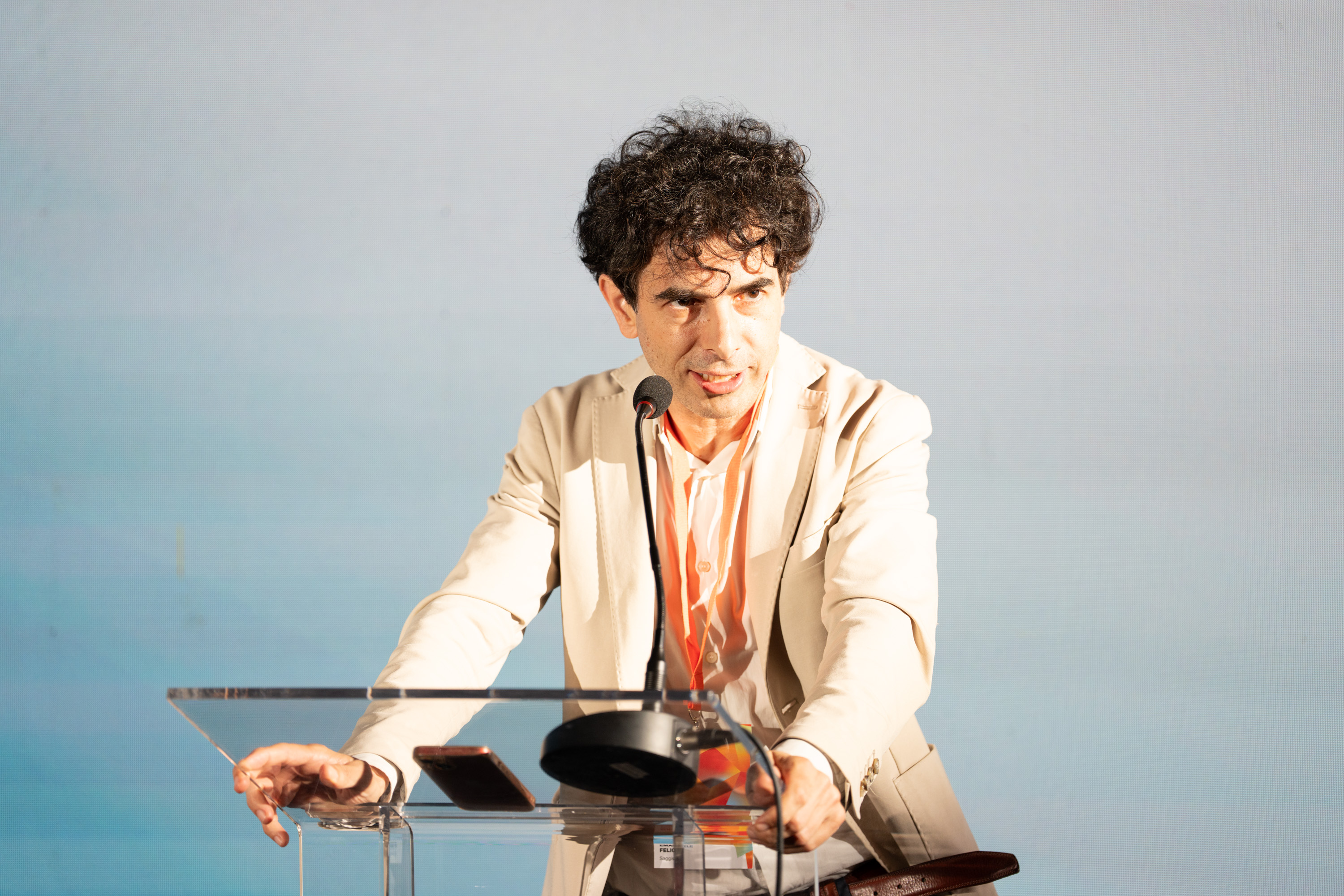
Emanuele Felice at the "Global Innovation South" Forum in Calabria, Italy, July 2025.

Emanuele Felice (b. 1977) is an Italian economist and historian, a leading figure in the Italian public debate. He is mostly known for his work, both in scholarly articles and books, about the reconstruction and interpretation of Italy's regional inequality and Southern question, as well as about Italy's long-run economic performance. More recently, he has been working on the historical relationship between economic growth, ethics and politics, and on the historical roots of liberalism and ecologism.

He has served as Head of the Economics Department of Italys' Democratic Party during the covid pandemic (2020-2021), then as a consultant of Draghi's government (2021-2022). He has been contributing as editorial writer to La Stampa, La Repubblica and Domani.

He is currently professor of Economic history at IULM University of Milan.

== Biography ==
A native of Lanciano, he holds a degree in Economics from the University of Bologna, a doctorate in Economic History from the University of Pisa, and then specialized at the London School of Economics, Pompeu Fabra University, and Harvard University.

Since 2022, he has been full professor of economic policy at the IULM University of Milan, where he teaches Economics of Culture and Economic History. In 2021 and 2022 he is also a Lecturer at LUISS, Luiss University, in Economic History. In 2015 and 2016 he was a columnist for La Stampa, from 2017 to 2020 he was a columnist for La Repubblica and L'Espresso, from 2020 he is a columnist for the daily newspaper Domani (newspaper).

In 2017, at the age of 40, he was awarded four full professorships (in Economic Policy, Applied Economics, Economic History, and Contemporary History).

In 2024, he is the curator of the first Critical Economics Festival, organized in Milan by the Giangiacomo Feltrinelli Foundation.

== Books ==
- Felice, Emanuele (2007). Divari regionali e intervento pubblico: per una rilettura dello sviluppo in Italia. Ricerca. Bologna: Il mulino. ISBN 978-88-15-11882-0.
- Felice, Emanuele (2016). Perché il Sud è rimasto indietro [Why Southern Italy Is Backward]. Storica paperbacks (2nd ed.). Bologna: Il Mulino. ISBN 978-88-15-26610-1.
- Felice, Emanuele (2017). Storia economica della felicità [An Economic History of Happiness]. Intersezioni. Bologna: Il mulino. ISBN 978-88-15-27379-6.
- Felice, Emanuele (2019). Il Sud, l'Italia, l'Europa: diario civile. Contemporanea. Bologna: Il mulino. ISBN 978-88-15-28363-4.
- Felice, Emanuele (2020). Dubai, l'ultima utopia [Dubai: The Last Utopia]. Bologna: Il Mulino. ISBN 978-88-15-28592-8.
- Felice, Emanuele (2022). La conquista dei diritti. Un'idea della storia [The Quest for Rights: Interpreting Human History]. Bologna: Il mulino. ISBN 978-88-15-27930-9.
- Felice, Emanuele; Mingardi, Alberto (2024). Libertà contro libertà. Un duello sulla società aperta [Freedom versus freedom. A duel over the open society]. Bologna: Il Mulino. ISBN 978-88-15-38869-8.
- Felice, Emanuele (2025). Ascesa e declino. Una storia dell'economia italiana [Rise and Decline: An Economic History of Italy] (2nd ed.). Bologna: Il Mulino. ISBN 978-88-15-27930-9.
- Felice, Emanuele (2025). Manifesto per un'altra economia e un'altra politica [Manifesto for a New Economy and Politics]. Milan: Feltrinelli. ISBN 9788807175046.
