= Chiaromonte =

- Comune
- Comune di Chiaromonte
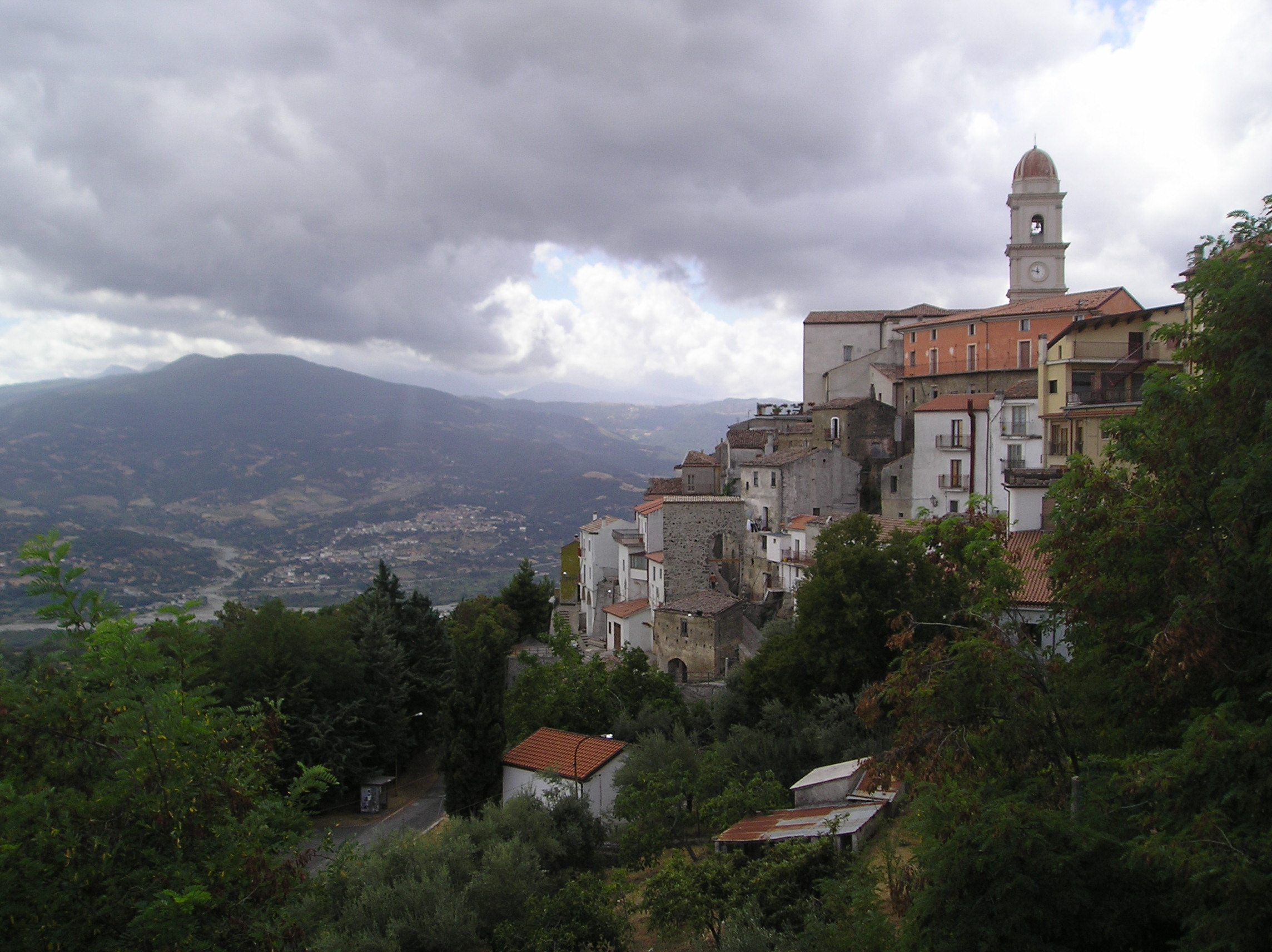
- View of Chiaromonte

- Location within Italy Location within Basilicata
- Coordinates: 40°7′N 16°13′E
- Country: Italy
- Region: Basilicata
- Province: Potenza (PZ)
- Frazioni: Armirosse, Battifarano, Bosco Magnano, Canocchielo-Pollino, Ponte, Cupolo, Grottole, Largo di Mezzo, Mancuoso, Pietrapica, Sagittario, Sammarella, San Pasquale, Sant'Uopo

Government
  - Mayor: Valentina Viola

Area
  - Total: 70.02 km^{2} (27.03 sq mi)
- Elevation: 794 m (2,605 ft)

Population (December 2008)
  - Total: 2,041
  - Density: 29.15/km^{2} (75.50/sq mi)
- Demonym: Chiaromontesi
- Time zone: UTC+1 (CET)
  - Summer (DST): UTC+2 (CEST)
- Postal code: 85032
- Dialing code: 0973
- ISTAT code: 076028
- Patron saint: St. John the Baptist
- Saint day: 24 June, 29 August
- Website: Official website

Chiaromonte is a town and comune in the province of Potenza, in the Southern Italian region of Basilicata. Under the pseudonym "Montegrano", it was the case study for Edward C. Banfield's The Moral Basis of a Backward Society.
