= The Moral Basis of a Backward Society =

1958 book by Edward C. Banfield

- Author: Edward C. Banfield
- Language: English
- Subject: familism in Southern Italy
- Publisher: Free Press
- Publication date: 1958
- Publication place: United States
- Pages: 188
- ISBN: 978-0-02-901510-0
- OCLC: 260562

The Moral Basis of a Backward Society is a book by Edward C. Banfield, an American political scientist who visited Montegrano, Italy (Montegrano is the fictitious name used by Banfield to protect the original town of Chiaromonte, in the Southern Italian region of Basilicata) in 1955. He observed a self-interested, family-centric society, which sacrificed the public good for the sake of nepotism and the immediate family. As an American, Banfield was witnessing what was to become infamous as the Southern Italian Mafias and a self-centered clan-system promoting the well-being of their inner group at the expense of the other ones. Banfield postulated that the backwardness of such a society could be explained "largely but not entirely" by "the inability of the villagers to act together for their common good or, indeed, for any end transcending the immediate, material interest of the nuclear family."

Banfield concluded that Montegrano's plight was rooted in the distrust, envy, and suspicion displayed by its inhabitants' relations with one another. Fellow citizens would refuse to help one another unless their own personal material gain was at stake. Many attempted to hinder their neighbors from attaining success, believing that others' good fortune would inevitably harm their own interests. Montegrano's citizens viewed their village life as little more than a battleground. Consequently, social isolation and poverty prevailed with an inability to work together to solve common social problems or even to pool common resources and talents to build infrastructure or address common economic concerns.

Montegrano's inhabitants were not unique or inherently more impious than other people. However, for various reasons, historical and cultural, they did not have what he termed "social capital", the habits, norms, attitudes, and networks to motivate people to work for the common good.

This stress on the nuclear family over the interest of the citizenry, he called the ethos of "amoral familism". This, he argued, was probably created by the combination of certain land-tenure conditions, a high mortality rate, and the absence of other community building institutions.

In 1993, James Q. Wilson wrote in Commentary that the "southern Italian family system [was] an example of such systems that are socially and politically dysfunctional...a model that Americans should avoid. Where such systems are found, America should erase them as fast as possible." In successive issues of Commentary, Peter Brimelow and Francis Fukuyama suggested that the "'amoral familism' of certain non-WASP immigrant groups is the cause of past and present organized crime in the United States. Initially applied primarily to Italian-Americans, "parallel beliefs" have since been applied to immigrants from Mexico, Colombia, China, Korean, and the former Soviet Union "again with an intellectual veneer of 'amoral familism' theories dressing up bigotries.

== See also ==
- Crab mentality
- Organized crime in Italy
- Social capital
- Southern Italy

== Sources ==
- Gambino, Richard (1999). "Italian Americans, Today's Immigrants, Multiculturalism, and the Mark of Cain". In D'Acierno, Pellegrino (ed.). The Italian American heritage: a companion to literature and arts. Garland reference library of the humanities. New York: Garland. ISBN 978-0-8153-0380-0.
