= Giustino Fortunato =

Italian historian and politician (1848–1932)

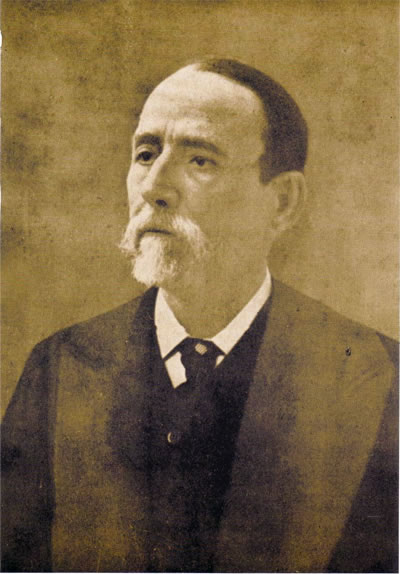
Giustino Fortunato

Giustino Fortunato (4 September 1848 – 23 July 1932) was an Italian historian and politician.

== Biography ==
He was born in Rionero in Vulture (Basilicata), from a bourgeois family. His great-uncle Giustino Fortunato senior (1777-1862) was the prime minister of the Kingdom of the Two Sicilies from 1849 to 1852. Fortunato studied at the Jesuit College and then studied law at the university in Naples. After the degree, he founded the journals Unità Nazionale and Patria. In May 1880, he was elected to the Italian Chamber of Deputies, until 1909 when he was appointed Senator until he retired from active politics in 1919.

Fortunato, along with other politicians like Pasquale Villari, Francesco Saverio Nitti, Gaetano Salvemini formed a group of socio-political thinkers called “meridionalisti” (“southernists”), in order to solve the economic problems of southern Italy after the Italian unification. Fortunato and others made the strong claim that the economic policies of the central government of the new state discriminated against the interests of the south while favouring those of the north. His houses in Naples, Rionero in Vulture and Gaudiano (fraction of Lavello) were renowned and hospitable meeting places for intellectuals such as Benedetto Croce (who dedicated his work Cultura e vita morale to Fortunato, published for the first time in 1914 by the publisher Laterza, as a sign of profound esteem). Giustino and his brother Ernesto, the first as a politician, active well beyond the parliamentary mandate, the other as an entrepreneur, almost symbiotically cultivated hegemonic ambitions beyond the borders of Basilicata for a lifetime

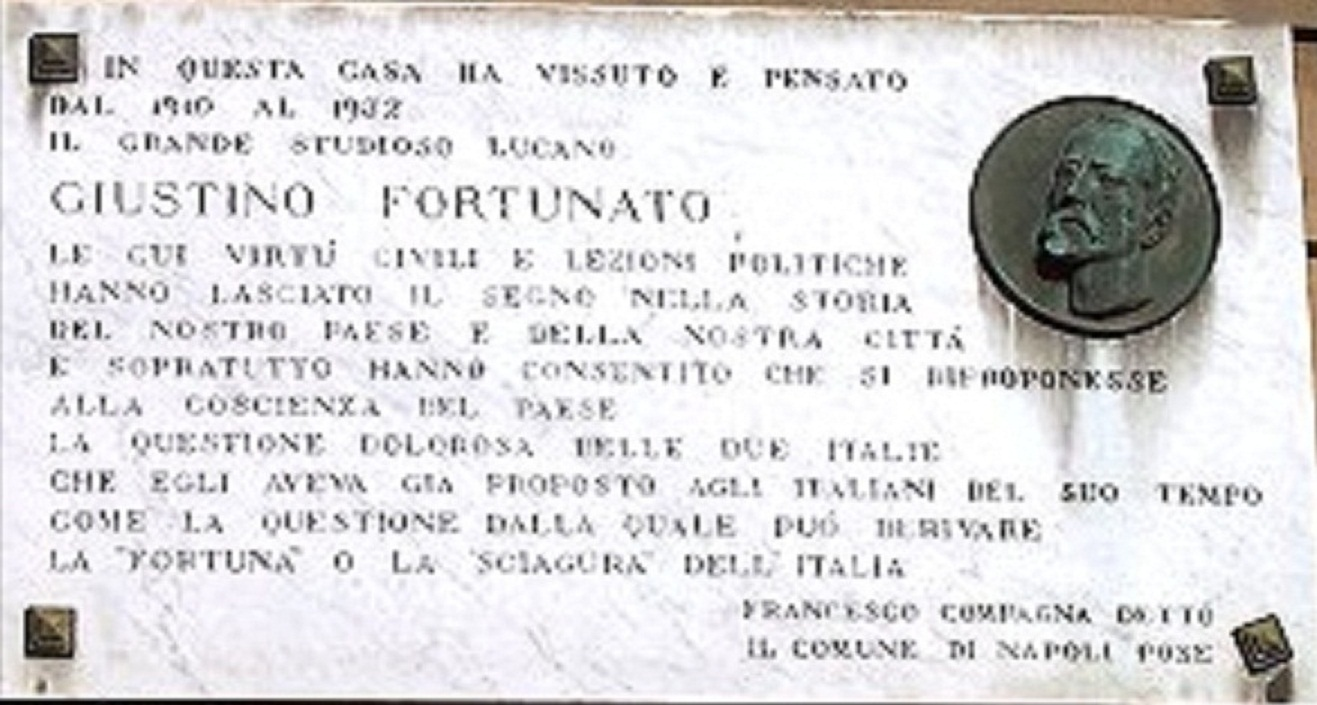
Via Vittoria Colonna, 14 (Naples)

Unlike many intellectuals of his time, he immediately perceived the nefarious nature of fascism, which he did not see as a renewal of the liberal state. With the establishment of the fascist regime, Fortunato tried to keep alive his "meridionalista" commitment and spread his anti-fascist thoughts. In this period, he wrote the essay "On the Fascist Regime" (1926) and to avoid the danger of censorship, he printed only a few copies and distributed them among his closest friends.

In his last years, he moved away from his native country because of a misunderstanding with his fellow citizens and two incidents that showed the ingratitude of the people, such as in 1917, when he was stabbed by a farmer in Rionero, who accused him of having supported the war.

Fortunato died in Naples at the age of 83.

In 2006, the Telematic University in Benevento was dedicated to him. The Library of Southern Studies (Biblioteca di Studi meridionali) "Giustino Fortunato" in Rome also bears his name and was founded in 1923 with a contribution from Fortunato himself. In Avellino, the Technical Commercial Institute bears his name, as also in Pisticci the Liceo Classico and in Rionero in Vulture the Palazzo Fortunato.

== Works ==
- Ricordi di Napoli, Milano, Treves, (1874).
- I Napoletani del 1799, Firenze, G. Barbèra, (1884).
- Santa Maria di Vitalba, Trani, V. Vecchi, (1898).
- Rionero medievale, Trani, V. Vecchi, (1899).
- Notizie storiche della Valle di Vitalba, 6 voll., Trani, V. Vecchi, (1898–1904).
- Il Mezzogiorno e lo Stato italiano. Discorsi politici, 1880-1910, 2 voll., Bari, Laterza, (1911).
- Pagine e ricordi parlamentari, I, Bari, Laterza, 1920; II, Firenze, A. Vallecchi, (1927).
- Riccardo da Venosa e il suo tempo, Trani, Vecchi e C., (1918).
- Rileggendo Orazio, in "Nuova Antologia", (1924).
- Nel regime fascista, (1926).
- Le strade ferrate dell'Ofanto, 1880-97, Firenze, Vallecchi, (1927).
- Carteggio tra Giustino Fortunato e Umberto Zanotti-Bianco, Roma, Collezione meridionale editrice, (1972).
- Carteggio, Roma-Bari, Laterza, (1978–1981).
- Giustino Fortunato e il Senato. Carteggio, 1909-1930, Soveria Mannelli, Rubbettino, (2003).
- Giustino Fortunato e le due Italie, Potenza, Villani Libri, G. Corrado, (2021)

== Honours ==
- Order of Saints Maurice and Lazarus, Commander, 1891
