= Edward C. Banfield =

American political scientist (1916–1999)

Edward Christie Banfield (November 19, 1916 – September 30, 1999) was an American political scientist, best known as the author of The Moral Basis of a Backward Society (1958), and The Unheavenly City (1970). His work was foundational to the advent of the policing tactic of broken windows theory, which was first advocated by his mentee James Q. Wilson in an Atlantic Monthly article entitled "Broken Windows".

One of the leading scholars of his generation, Banfield was an adviser to three Republican presidents: Richard Nixon, Gerald Ford, and Ronald Reagan. Banfield began his academic career at the University of Chicago, where he was a friend and colleague of Leo Strauss and Milton Friedman. In the latter half of the twentieth century Banfield contributed to shape American conservatism through the publication of sixteen books and numerous articles on urban politics, urban planning and civic culture.

In 1959, Banfield went to Harvard, where he remained for the rest of his career except for a brief tenure at the University of Pennsylvania.

== Family ==
Banfield grew up on a farm in Bloomfield, Connecticut and attended the University of Connecticut, where he studied English and agriculture.

His wife, Laura Fasano Banfield, learned Italian as a child, and she helped her husband with his book about Chiaromonte, a poor village in Southern Italy (The Moral Basis of a Backward Society). She also collaborated with Harvey Mansfield on a translation of Niccolò Machiavelli's Florentine Histories. She died in 2006.

Banfield’s son, Elliott, is an artist/designer/cartoonist in New York City; his daughter, Laura, is founding partner of law firm Hoguet, Newman, & Regal, LLP and the mother of three daughters, Laura Kosar, Helen LaCroix, and Marie Hoguet.

== Involvement with government aid programs ==
Banfield worked for the U.S. Department of Agriculture and the Farm Security Administration, traveled in the West, and observed the effects of government projects. Although he initially supported President Franklin Roosevelt and the New Deal, Banfield gradually became skeptical of government attempts to construct housing, support the arts, etc. Well before Lyndon Johnson's Great Society programs, Banfield had decided that government aid to the poor would make the givers of aid feel virtuous but would not improve the lives of the receivers of aid. He argued that "the real reason for the passage" of the legislation establishing the National Endowment for the Arts "was, and is, to benefit... the culture industry of New York City."

Banfield's views were controversial, and The Unheavenly City sparked much debate. According to MacInnes, Banfield:

made a simple and well-documented case that the problems played out in ghetto neighborhoods were a consequence of concentrated lower-class populations. Race was not the critical issue, he said. The black poor, Banfield suggested, were no different from other (white) lower-class Americans: they had no fondness for work, no strong family ties, an easy acceptance of criminal behavior, no brief for schooling, and no future perspective. Banfield argued that even well-pruned government programs could not undo the harm caused by class differences.

His Harvard colleagues described him as "an individual with a strong and distinctive character that impressed itself on all who met him" and as a man who enjoyed " the delights of humor, long meals, and friendly company." Banfield had "a reputation as a brilliant maverick", and his "books and articles had a sharp contrarian edge. He was a critic of almost every mainstream liberal idea in domestic policy, especially the use of federal aid to help relieve urban poverty."

Banfield taught many conservative scholars, including James Q. Wilson and Martha Derthick. He also taught Christopher DeMuth and Bruce Kovner, leading figures at the conservative think-tank, American Enterprise Institute. He was elected a Fellow of the American Academy of Arts and Sciences in 1961.

== Published works ==
- Government Project (1951)
- Politics, Planning, and the Public Interest, with Martin Meyerson (1955)
- The Moral Basis of a Backward Society (1958)
- Government and Housing in Metropolitan Areas, with Morton M. Grodzins (1958)
- A Report on the Politics of Boston, with Martha Derthick (1960)
- Political Influence (1961/1982/2003)
- Urban Government: A Reader in Politics and Administration (1961)
- City Politics, with James Q. Wilson (1963)
- American Foreign Aid Doctrines (1963)
- Big City Politics (1965)
- Boston: The Job Ahead, with Martin Meyerson (1966)
- The Unheavenly City (1970)
- The Unheavenly City Revisited: A Revision of The Unheavenly City (1974, reprinted 2025)
- The Democratic Muse: Visual Arts and the Public Interest (1984)
- Here the People Rule: Selected Essays (1985, reprinted with additional essays in 1991)
