= Economic history of pre-unitarian Italy =

Economic history of Italy before 1860

The economic history of pre-unitarian Italy traces the economic and social changes of the Italian territory from the Roman era to the unification of Italy (1860).

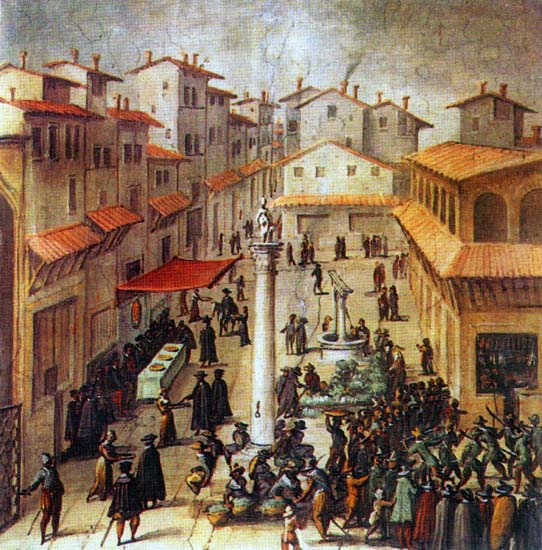
Florence, Piazza del Mercato Vecchio (1555), fresco by Stradanus, Palazzo Vecchio, Sala di Gualdrada.

In the Roman era, the Italian peninsula had a higher population density and economic prosperity than the rest of Europe and the Mediterranean basin, especially during the 1st and 2nd centuries. Beginning in the 3rd century CE, the Roman Empire began to decline, and so did the Italian territory and its cities.

During the early Middle Ages (7th-9th centuries), the economy was in a depressed, semi-subsistence state, gravitating around feudal centers. Beginning in the 10th century, the Italian population and economy began to grow again, along with urban centers. Extensive trade networks developed over time, linking Italian centers to a network of relations from Asia to northern Europe. These centers of manufacturing, financial, mercantile and cultural activities made the Italian economy more prosperous than other European countries.

The arrival of the Black Death in the mid-1300s decimated the population, but it was soon followed by an economic revival. This growth produced a prosperous Renaissance economy that was advanced compared to European countries. Italy's leading sectors were textiles (woollen and silk workmanship, widely exported), banking services, and maritime transport.

During the 1600s, the economic system weakened and enterprises linked to the major urban centers declined. Holland, England and France assumed a prominent economic role in Europe, and Italy lost its dominant position in textile exports, financial intermediation and shipping. Stagnation initiated a shattering of economic relations in the Italian area.

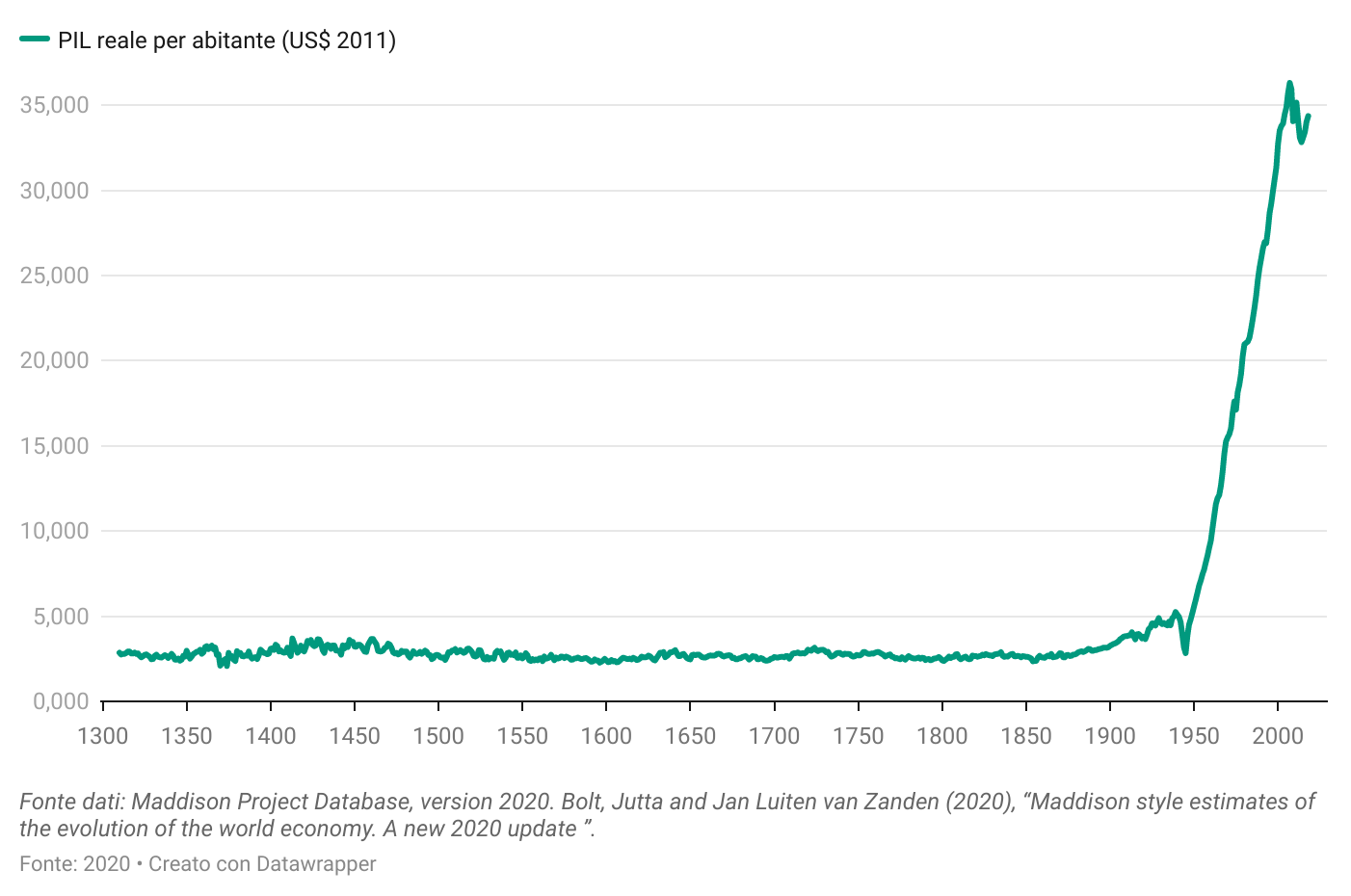
Real gross domestic product (GDP) of the Italian territory per inhabitant during 1310-2018. In the long run, the average wealth of Italians remained almost constant until the industrial revolution of the late 1800s. The economic cycles over many previous centuries, with phases of growth and crisis, did not produce significant economic change (in terms of GDP per inhabitant).

Between the eighteenth and mid-nineteenth centuries, Italy remained divided into small states, many of them under foreign domination: this context did not favor the economic and commercial growth and competitiveness of the Italian area. However, some Italian states initiated major economic reforms that would have long-term implications. Clear socio-economic differences between the north and south began to emerge.

== Roman era ==
=== Rise (3rd centuries BC-II AD) ===
Historians and economists have tried to reconstruct a view of the economy of the Roman centuries and its changes according to contemporary interpretations of economics; some have also undertaken quantitative studies. The studies have not produced precise results that are generally agreed upon. However, some general notions about the economy of Roman times have become fairly accepted.

The Italian peninsula had a higher population density and economic prosperity than the rest of Europe and the Mediterranean basin. This is especially true for the 1st and 2nd centuries, which represented a period of relative political stability and peak economic conditions. Demographic estimates of Italy's population in Roman times vary. The most accepted attest it at 7 to 8 million. Some scholars estimate it as high as 15-16 million: this estimate would represent a level that would later be reached again only by the 18th century.

Imperial economic power centralized toward Italy the flow of economic resources from the provinces. Relative economic prosperity was also supported by advanced political and administrative institutions (including the legal system); technological (especially in construction) and scientific expertise; and general cultural progress, especially in the numerous cities.

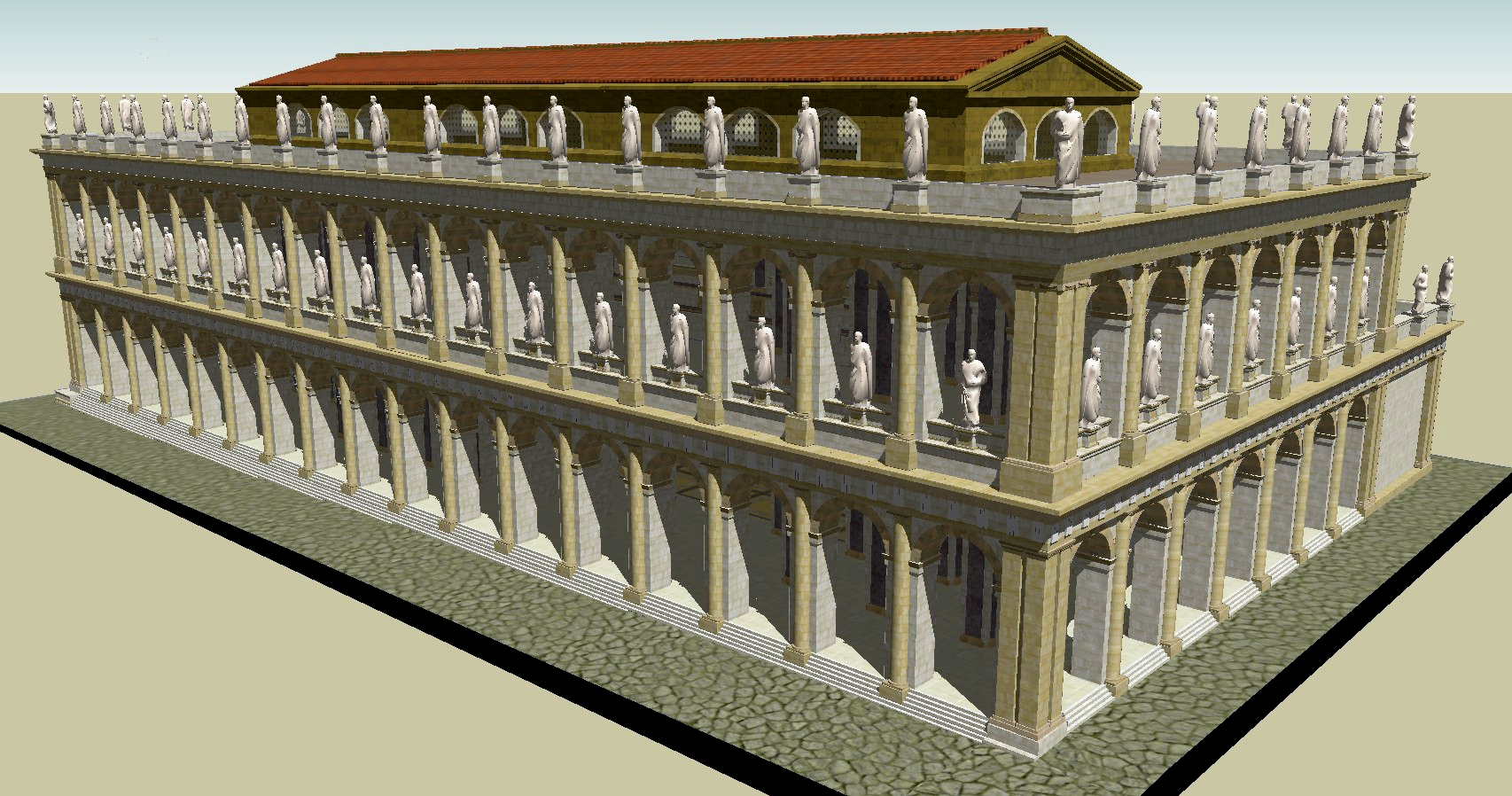
Digital reconstruction of the Basilica Julia in Rome. Civil basilicas, built near the forum in Roman cities, were seats of courts and other public institutions. Today a detailed understanding of the Roman economy is not available because sources on economic factors of the time are limited. However, it is commonly accepted that the body of Roman laws and public institutions produced an important and relatively homogeneous environment that fostered the economic life of the empire.

Quantitative assessments of the Roman economy available today are considered speculative. However, beyond absolute figures, they suggest significantly greater wealth in the peninsula than in other regions of southern Europe and the Mediterranean basin. Above all, estimates assume that, during the three centuries preceding the Augustan age, there was growth in average per capita income: to observe another such occurrence, one must wait until the onset of the Industrial Age.

=== Decline (centuries III-VI AD) ===
Beginning in the third century AD, the Roman empire began to decline. Historians have proposed hundreds of theories about its causes (political, economic, demographic, social, cultural, environmental): it is likely that many factors contributed to it. One objective fact was the demographic decline that hit the peninsula, which some historians link to two pandemics (2nd and 3rd centuries).

At the end of the 3rd century, the administration of Emperor Diocletian introduced a major tax reform: for the first time the Italian population was taxed (previously it had been exempt). Taxation particularly affected the less populous areas of the Empire and contributed to further population decline in western regions, including Italy. In order to ensure fiscal stability in the face of demographic and economic decline, the empire prevented peasants from moving, and bound them to the land by establishing the colonate; limits on movement were also imposed on those belonging to some urban professions, and in general craft and professional activities were rigidly framed in collegia, closely supervised by state authority. The move of the imperial capital to Constantinople in 330 CE moved the political and social center away from Italy and contributed to its further decline. The invasions of the Goths and Vandals (5th century) and Justinian's long war of reconquest (6th century) accelerated the peninsula's sharp demographic decline.

Along with demographic, political and economic changes, the Italian territory also saw a decline in the urban realities whose cultural richness had sustained its most prosperous age. The imperial administration extracted resources for the benefit of itself, large landowners and, increasingly, the clergy, while suppressing the social vitality of the Italian territory, now peripheral to the Empire. Culture also began to change, moving away from the values of previous eras.

Despite the decline of urban centers, the centrality of the city in Italy held out longer than the countryside, from which the profits of the landed aristocracy came. This situation did not change under the reign of Odoacer or even under Ostrogothic rule. With Theodoric, whose policies continued to rely on the urban landowning class, a modest recovery occurred; in fact, however, the economy was based on the same dynamics in place in the late empire.

== Middle Ages ==
=== Early Middle Ages (7th-9th centuries) ===
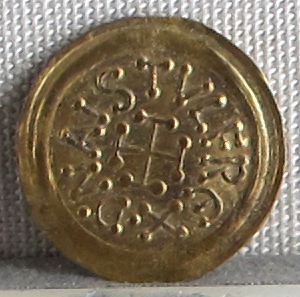
Gold coin of King Aistulf

In the early Middle Ages, cities were largely depopulated and the countryside became impoverished. However, unlike in continental Europe, numerous small towns in Italy remained in existence stemming from the urbanization of the Roman period that were the basis for the recovery after the year 1000. The economy was depressed and revolved around centers of feudal estates, such as abbeys and castles. The rural economy rested on semi-subsistence agricultural production, while trade was limited and relied on annual fairs.

==== Byzantine and Lombard period ====
When the Lombards arrived in Italy, they found an economy exhausted by tax burdens and dominated by latifundia, still hinging on the role of cities whose socio-political structures, however, were in decline.

In the Lombard Kingdom the political and institutional structures of Roman inheritance dissolved completely; the ancient landed aristocracy in time was ousted by the new invaders, who acquired the large estates, completely redefining the situation of the countryside. With the Lombards, in fact, forests and uncultivated lands acquired great importance: the exploitation of forests guaranteed resources such as timber and wild fruits, as well as being used for the wild breeding of pigs and sheep. However, toward the end of the Lombard era there was an economic shift, with the proliferation of mints under Liutprand and the attestation of a rather dynamic merchant class.

The context of political fragmentation in which southern Italy found itself, more so than northern Italy, accentuated the dissolution of the urban fabric, especially for cities located inland. Despite this, there were no major economic differences between Langobardia Minor and the residual areas ruled by the Byzantines, who particularly maintained control of the coastal territories. In the Byzantine area, too, the landowning class was replaced, but in this case by ecclesiastical bodies.

Political relations with Byzantium nevertheless allowed some coastal cities in peninsular Italy (such as Venice, Comacchio, Bari, Gaeta, Amalfi, Naples and Salerno) to retain a certain commercial vitality, while Sardinia and Corsica found themselves excluded and forced into a subsistence economy. In contrast, Sicily enjoyed relative prosperity between the 6th and 8th centuries, a development that continued and increased with the subsequent Arab conquest.

==== Carolingian period ====
The arrival of the Franks in the second half of the 8th century introduced the manorial system in the management of land holdings, leading to the establishment of the feudal system in Italy as well. The curtes, or farms, were set up on an autarkic economy, tending solely to meet the owner's needs for both food and handicrafts. This was because agrarian investment and increased land productivity were seen as unattractive, due to the market's limited capacity to market agricultural goods.

Despite the depression of local markets, trade continued: first of all, luxury goods were still imported from the East; moreover, during the 9th century fairs spread to many Italian cities. This progress in trade activities occurred mainly in the cities located along the Po River, stimulating in part the exchange of local products and thus causing a modest strain on agricultural and artisan production.

These phenomena, which caused openings in the closed circuits of the feudal economy, had to be measured against the unstable climate of the time. What disturbed these attempts at economic dynamism were the incursions of the Hungarians and various Slavic peoples, which followed one another frequently since 899, and the threat of the Saracens particularly in the Tyrrhenian Sea. However, Islamic expansion also led on the other hand to an increase in trade, which Venice was especially able to take advantage of.

=== Late Middle Ages (10th-15th centuries) ===
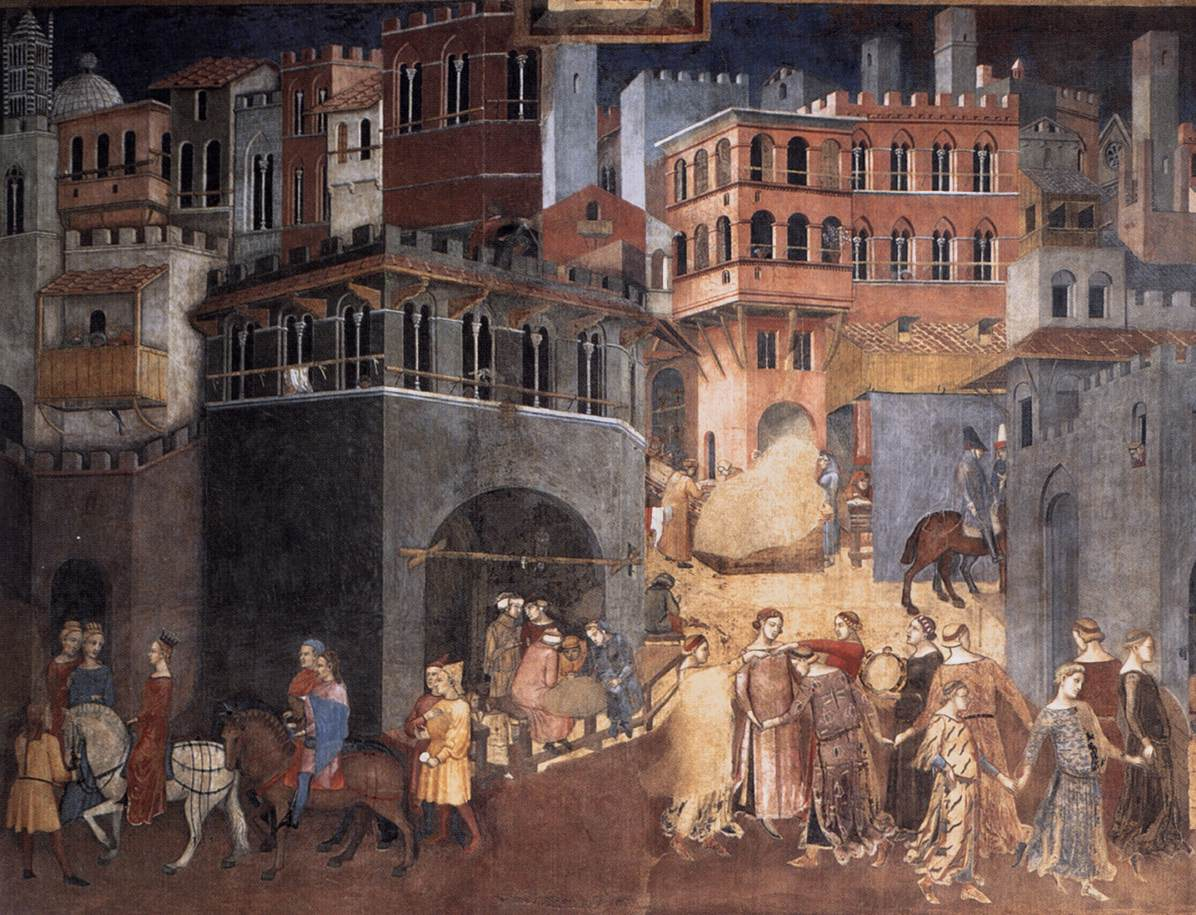
Ambrogio Lorenzetti, Effects of Good Government on the City Life. (1338-1339), Palazzo Pubblico, Siena

Beginning in the 10th century, Italy's population and economy began to grow again. A number of technological innovations improved agricultural productivity: the three-year crop rotation and improved plowing through the adoption of the heavy wheel plow and a greater use of horses rather than cattle. Industrial use of the water mill in textile, metal, and other manufactures also became widespread.

At the beginning of the late Middle Ages, the most prosperous region in Italy was Sicily. During the period of Islamic rule Palermo became the second largest city in Europe after Cordoba (its population has been estimated between 120,000-350,000).

According to many scholars, the Italian population doubled between the 10th and 14th centuries (similar to other European countries). It has been estimated that in 1300, 21% of the Italian population (estimated at 13 million) lived in cities: the rate of urbanization was similar in Spain, but much lower in France, Germany and the U.K. At the beginning of the 14th century, Milan, Venice and Florence had more than 100,000 inhabitants; there were 43 cities with at least 15,000 inhabitants.

From the 13th century especially in the north and center, cities flourished as centers of manufacturing, financial, mercantile and cultural activities. A more complex society than the rural one gradually developed there: the economically dominant part, which took the name of the bourgeoisie, consisted of merchants, entrepreneurs, professionals, bankers and artisans. The development of communal institutions allowed many towns to flourish as independent centers, run by the economically more influential classes, and autonomous from the rural feudal system.

Extensive trade networks developed over time, linking Italian centers to a pool of relations from Asia to northern Europe. Italy's major trading cities (Pisa, Venice, Genoa, and Amalfi) took advantage of Western military expansion (the repeated Crusades), to which they offered logistical and financial services. Frequently, colonial and commercial expansion was undertaken very aggressively through piracy. Trade fueled manufacturing capabilities, including in sectors such as textiles, through contacts with Flanders and England, where there was the most sophisticated textile production. Italian trading cities imported what were the valuable industrial products of the time, to re-export them to the Mediterranean basin, from which they then imported spices, silk, cotton and many other products. Along the trade routes, in which Italy was often central, traveled knowledge and technological innovations, which amplified the economic and social impact of trade. There were important innovations in production systems. The spread of tenancy and metayage contracts favored a more market-oriented agrarian economy. The development of legal systems enabled the growth of mercantile and financial companies. The Venetian sequin and Florentine florin became the main currencies for trade in Europe. Major Italian banking companies (especially Florentine ones) operated on a vast international scale.

Although amid great uncertainties, it has been estimated that Italy's per capita GDP during the late Middle Ages was much higher than that of other Mediterranean and northern European countries, which by contrast experienced a long economic stagnation during that era. Economic growth in Italy produced a clear improvement in the living conditions of the population.

==== Crisis of the 14th century ====
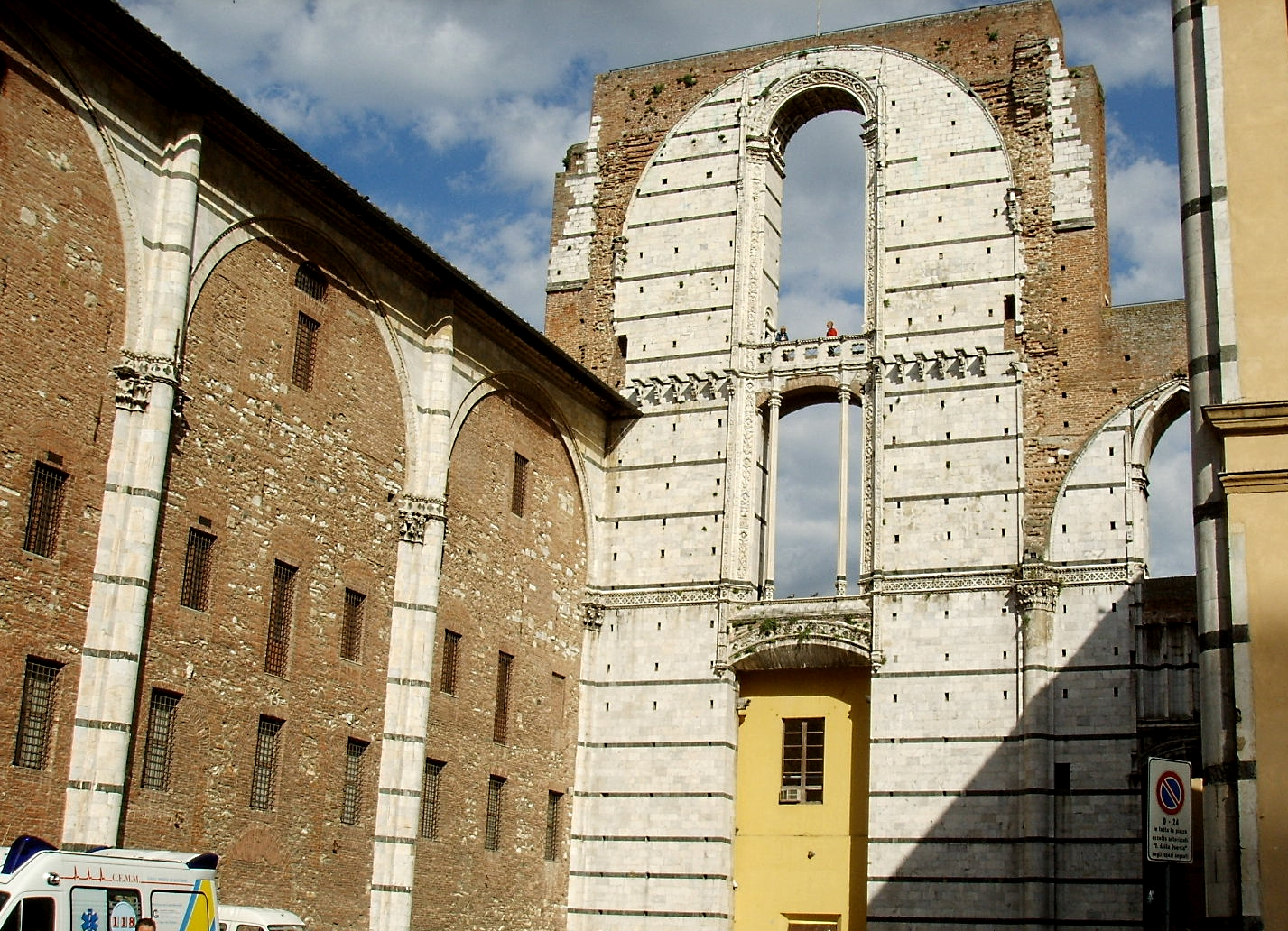
The economic expansion of many European cities during the 11th-13th centuries was associated with a boom in the construction of cathedrals. The construction of a city cathedral represented one of the largest investments in infrastructure at the time. Construction sites lasted decades or even centuries. The start of construction of Siena Cathedral dates back to at least the late 12th century. In the early 1300s, the city's economic prosperity stimulated an ambitious expansion project. The project was abandoned after the plague of 1347. The unfinished new facade remains as a testament to the impact of the economic and social crisis.

In 1347, the Black Death arrived in Europe, killing a third of its population in a few years. In Italy, this demographic catastrophe was very pronounced. It was followed after a few decades, however, by an economic revival. The lack of labor did indeed raise wages for workers in the cities (attracting more people there) and decrease agrarian rents (benefiting the peasants and weakening the feudal lords). Political power was not centralized, but was increasingly becoming a multiplicity of centers and political systems, amid the many conflicts that divided church and empire, cities and feudal lords, and centers among themselves. This decentralization, which was not only political but also cultural, gave a new direction to the economic revival: it favored the growth of cities rather than the reinvigoration of the feudal system (as had happened during the demographic crisis of the second and third centuries CE). After the plague, trade, manufacturing, universities, corporations, participation of the poorer classes in the economy, and legal and cultural institutions that enabled the expansion of the market economy continued to grow.

== Modern Age ==
=== Renaissance (16th century) ===
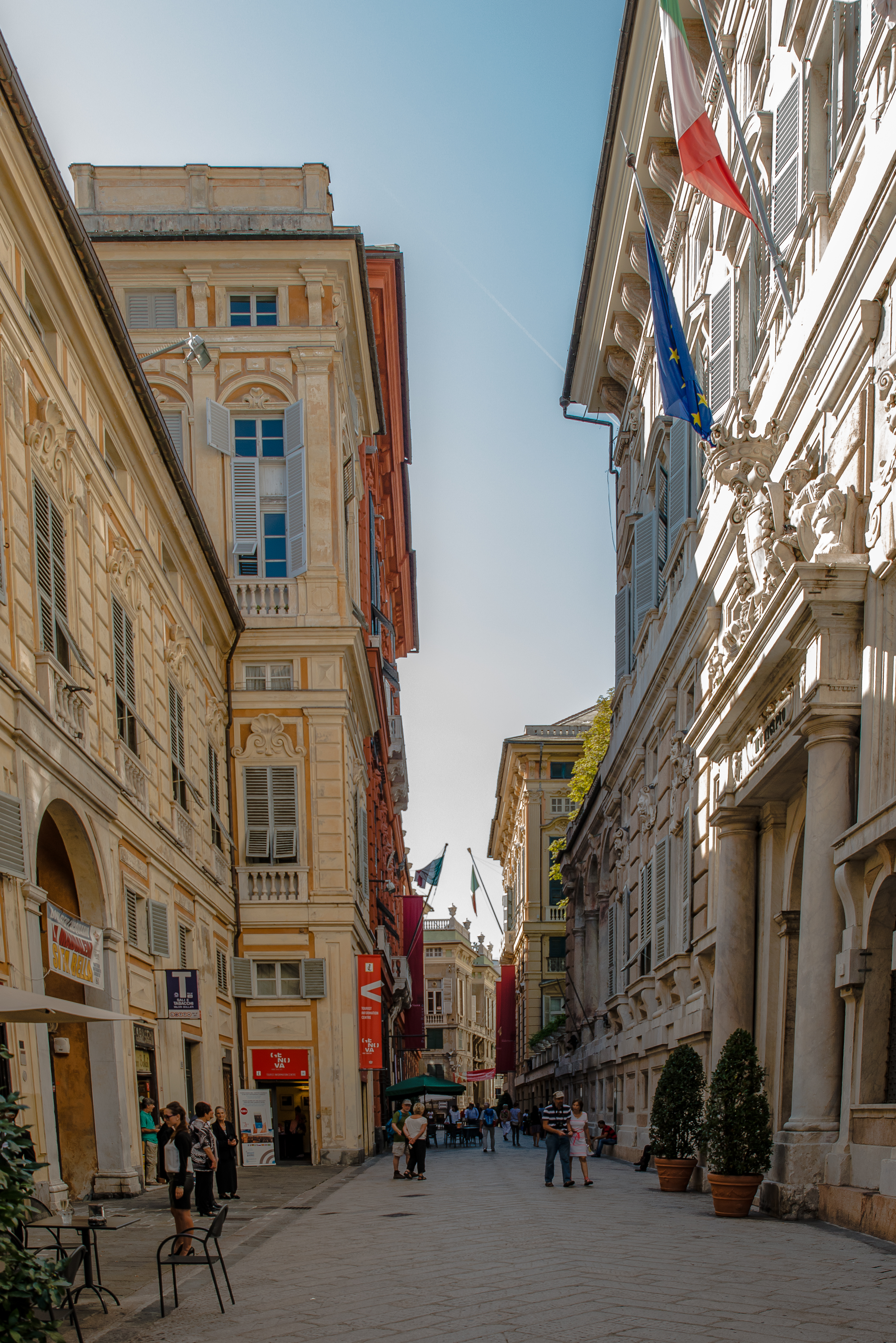
In the second half of the 1500s, the wealthiest Genoese merchant, banker, and shipowning families built a series of palaces along Strada Nuova, outside the medieval center. This urban development is physical evidence of the peak of Genoa's maritime and financial economy.

The repeated waves of plague between 1350 and 1450 probably halved the Italian urban population. The weakening of small towns favored the regional expansion of major cities: Venice, Milan, Florence, Genoa, and Naples, which promoted greater political and territorial stability. Economic recovery was particularly pronounced in central Italy beginning in 1450. Silk processing, as well as new industries, such as firearms and printing, spread.

The growth, which thus had its roots in the demographic crisis of the early Middle Ages, produced a flourishing Renaissance economy that was advanced compared to European countries. The leading sectors in the Italian territory were textiles (woollen and silk manufactures, which were widely exported), banking services, and shipping. It has been estimated that per capita income in north-central Italy reached a level that would not be reached again until the end of the 19th century. The growth rewarded the elite: there was great economic inequality. This economic expansion was the basis for the cultural and artistic flowering of the period.

=== Stagnation of the 1600s ===
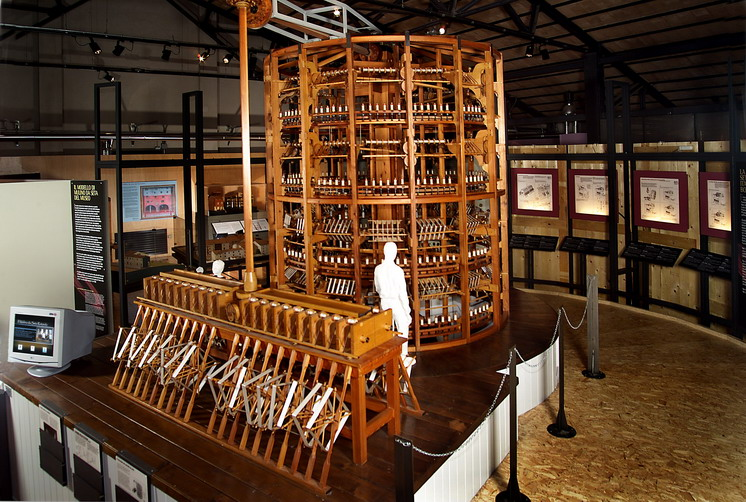
Model of a Bolognese silk mill. From the 15th century Bologna established itself as the major European center of silk yarn and veil production. From the 16th century a special mill was introduced, powered by water wheel, capable of mechanizing the process of tanning and twisting silk thread. The machine is regarded as the highest European technology before the steam engine and anticipated the factory system of the Industrial Revolution. By 1683 the city had 119 silk mills. Bolognese industry then declined during the 18th century.

During the 1600s the economic system weakened. Holland, England and France assumed a prominent economic role in Europe, and Italy lost its dominant position in textile exports, financial intermediation and shipping. Due to the decline of city enterprises, Italy became an importer of manufactured goods including textiles and exporter of primary agricultural products (oil, wheat, wine, wool, and silk).

The extent of this decline is debated and historians' estimates remain uncertain. According to some it was a true decline; according to others it was an economic stagnation that produced a competitive decline relative to other European economies. The economies of Holland and England, and later France and Germany, were much more dynamic during that period and headed toward an earlier industrial revolution.

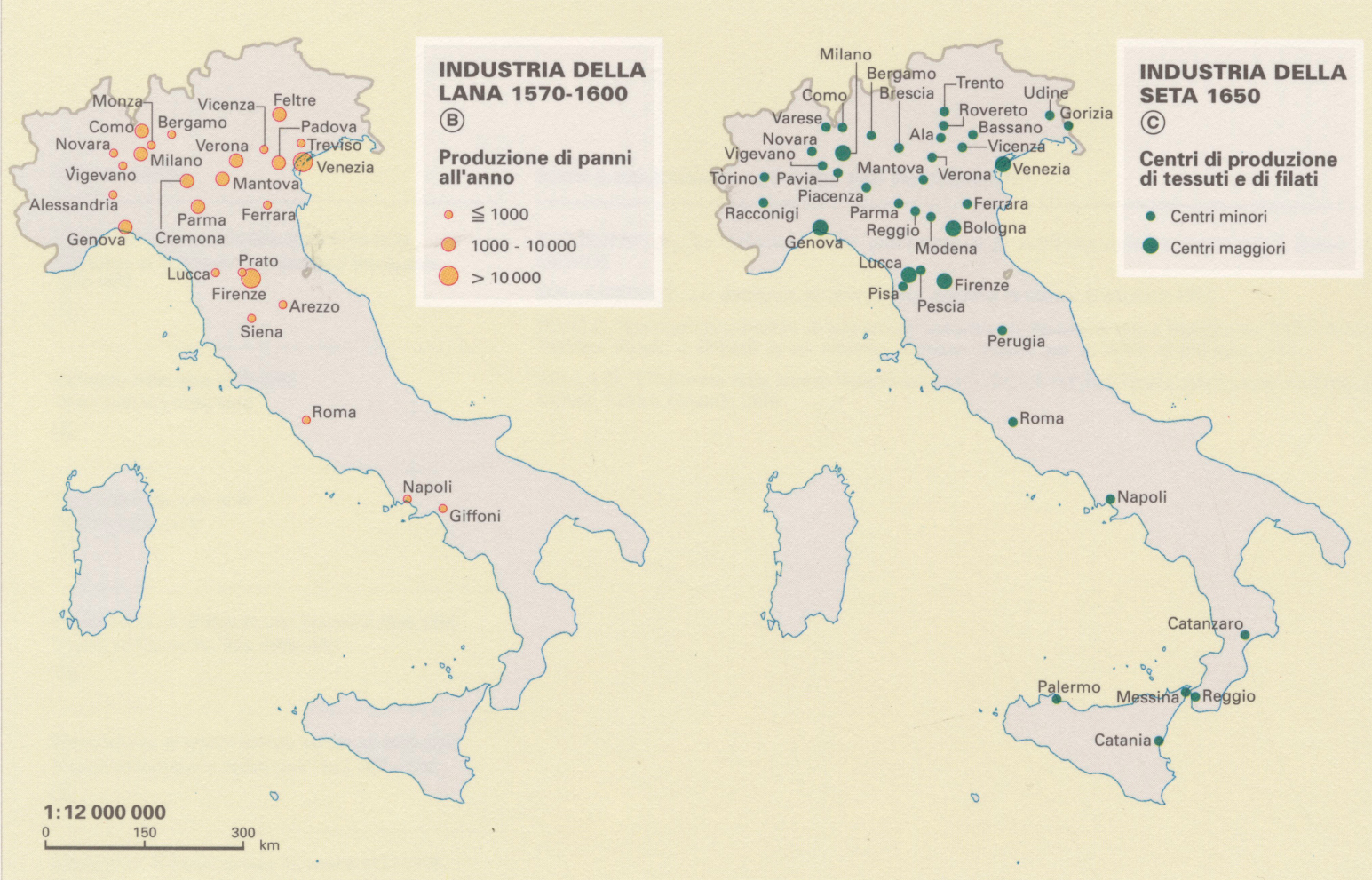
Diffusion of the wool industry between 1570-1600 and the silk industry in the 1650s.

Historians have proposed several causes for this development: the plague epidemics, which caused a sharp decline in population during the 1600s; the increasing centrality of transatlantic trade as opposed to Mediterranean trade; as well as the impact of wars fought by foreign powers in Italy and the domination of the Spanish in the south (who heavily taxed the territories they controlled). According to other historians, these factors alone are not sufficient to explain the Italian stagnation of the 1600s because many of them also affected other European countries that in contrast showed greater economic dynamism. Politically, Italy's small regional entities were not of sufficient size to support their economies with adequate monetary and trade policy interventions or investments in transportation. This disadvantaged Italian economic actors in the competition of trade, mercantile routes and colonial expansion.

It has also been hypothesized that the Italian economy of the 1500s grew rapidly but in an unbalanced way, and this consequently increased the prices of agricultural products as demand for them increased as a result of population growth without raising the yield of land; this benefited landowners and disadvantaged the more innovative sectors of the economy. Over time, growing economic inequality, also exacerbated by strong indirect taxation by small political entities, limited local demand for the most innovative products, which were not accessible to the vast majority of the population. Thus growth did not fuel a domestic demand capable of supporting the development of sophisticated industries and services. The fundamentals of growth thus failed, contributing to the decline in the next century.

Cultural and institutional factors have also been proposed as contributing to the slower growth of the capital and entrepreneurial economy in Italy than in other European countries during the seventeenth century: a lower cultural openness to innovation; and the influence of conservative institutions, such as guilds and small local lordships, which rigidly regulated and defended the status quo and hindered productive innovation.

This set of factors thus generated prolonged economic stagnation. The capital available from the wealthier urban classes was invested in art as well as religious and civic buildings to a considerable extent rather than in productive sectors. Such investments produced the extensive artistic and architectural heritage that the period has left as its testimony.

==== Savoy Piedmont ====
In the Savoy dominions, the central government played an important role in managing the national economy, following the example of neighboring France. In particular, Victor Amadeus II succeeded in reorganizing the state by making it more efficient and implementing a series of colbertist measures. Reforms included the establishment of the land cadastre in 1731, the creation of provincial intendancies and the limitation of ecclesiastical privileges; inland manufactures were protected and safeguarded, while other industries were created through patents and privileges; and finally, continuous military campaigns had the effect of sustaining public spending.

Agriculture had a remarkable development, as a result of canalization and reclamation works as well as attractive policies that brought in settlers from Lombardy and Liguria. The expansion of crops, especially in the lower plains, saw a strong expansion of rice farming; however, the leading sector soon became the silk industry. In fact, mulberry cultivations were planted and skilled artisans were recruited; a ban on the export of raw silk was imposed, thus favoring silk twisting, which became the country's main industry.

These policies paid off, as there was strong economic growth after 1660: revenue from trade duties doubled over the next thirty years, while total production reached two and a half times in the first half of the eighteenth century compared to the previous period.

Although these policies led to an increase in productivity, they did not promote an improvement in incomes, and a worsening of inequality developed, especially in the seventeenth century; in fact, even in the Savoy dominions, as in the rest of Italy, this was due to the increase in population and indirect taxation. Another limitation was the weakness of the state, which, like the other Italian states, only partially succeeded in developing an effective mercantilist policy, as was the case in other parts of Europe, due to the inability to protect markets from foreign competition on pain of retaliation, and again due to political power, which only partially succeeded in imposing favorable conditions for trade and failed to enter into colonial competition.

==== State of Milan ====
The crisis of the seventeenth century was felt dramatically in Spanish Lombardy: the plague of 1630 and the interruption of the influx of American silver led to a paralysis of production and trade that lasted at least until 1660. The manufacturing apparatus collapsed while government policies, initially uncertain, were ineffective and mercantilist attempts essentially failed.

The urban patriciate, composed of large landowners, helped revitalize the agrarian sector but at the same time caused manufacturing production to decline; the region's economy underwent a profound transformation, now directed toward the export of agricultural products and semi-finished goods, such as raw and twisted yarns.

==== Papal States ====
The economy of the Papal States during this period was generally static and depressed. The absence of a merchant class and the ruling classes' lack of interest in productive investment were among the main factors in the substantial economic immobility. Despite the complete absence of a commercial and industrial tradition, the Banco di Santo Spirito was established in Rome in 1605 as an institution to collect savings and underwrite public debt, favored by the strong inflow of money due mainly to ecclesiastical tithes and substantial religious wealth.

Despite the strong movement of capital, manufacturing production remained fragile and luxury consumption, in particular, was oriented toward foreign countries; this resulted in the dominance of foreign merchants - oriented toward speculation - and a large deficit in the balance of trade. The Papal States reacted only through measures against the import of foreign goods and manufactured goods, without an organic economic policy.

==== Kingdom of Naples ====
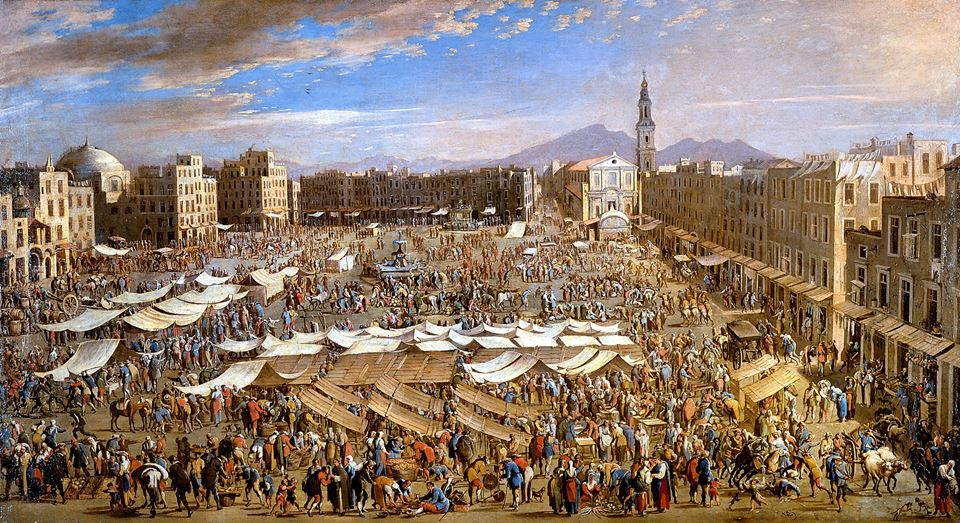
Naples, market square, 17th century. Painting by Micco Spadaro.

The Kingdom of Naples suffered from political subordination to the Spanish Empire, which demanded continuous contributions for its expenses, particularly military ones. The result was the growth of fiscal pressure and public debt, as well as the absence of investment by the authorities in economic activities.

Moreover, the increase in taxation was done by increasing indirect taxes, which resulted in a worsening of the lives of the humblest, since it involved an increase in the price of basic necessities.

Fiscal policy did not follow a consistent economic logic, but was designed to cover the enormous expenses of the Spanish Crown, while avoiding the baronial and ecclesiastical estates that enjoyed privileges and immunities. Various restrictions on trade and agricultural exports, as well as high customs duties and excise taxes, weakened productive activities and the capital market: it was therefore preferable to invest in tax revenues.

The inability to independently manage its economy was the main cause of the depression of a state that had to cope with international changes. The revolt of Masaniello was in fact due to the heavy tax burden, while the plague of 1656 aggravated the dramatic conditions in which the economy of southern Italy was struggling.

=== From the 18th century to Unification ===
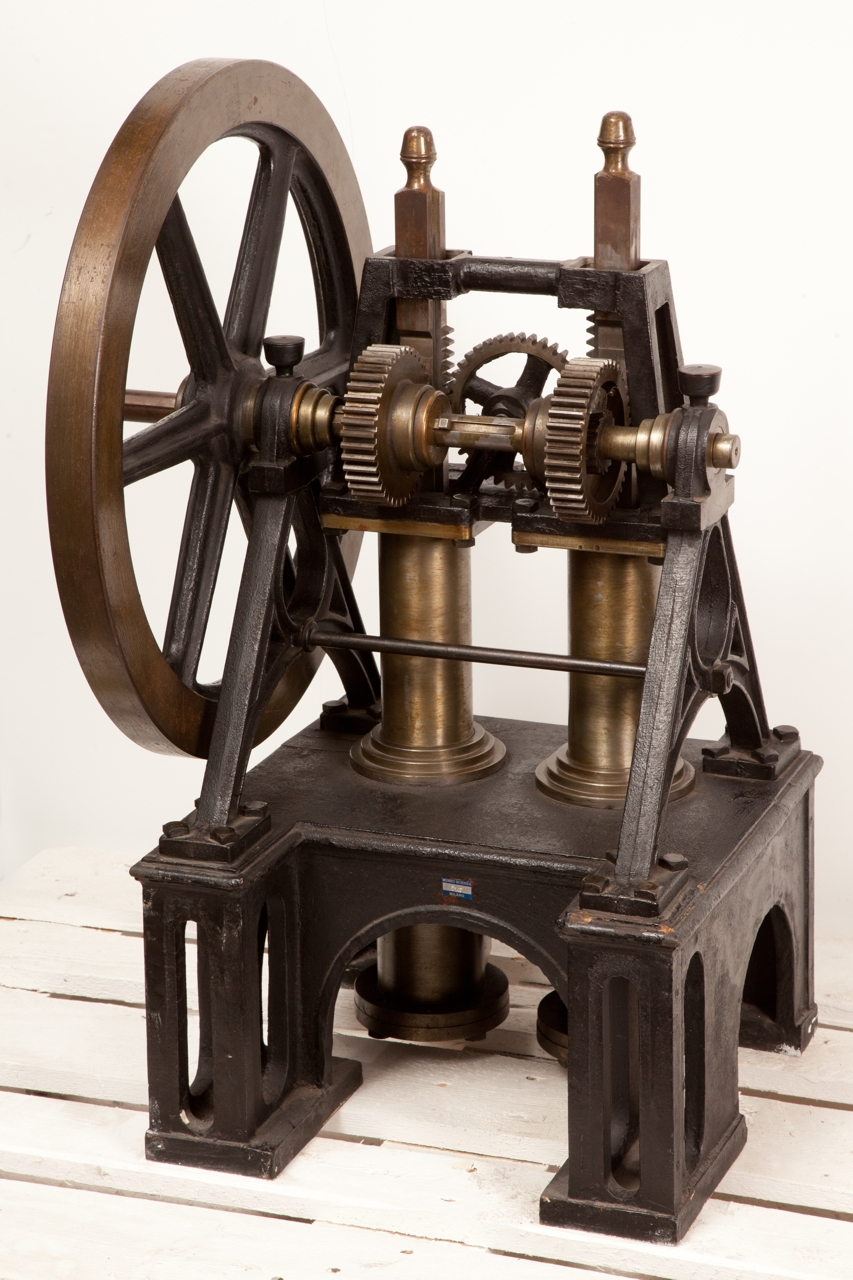
The Barsanti-Matteucci engine, the first proper internal combustion engine

Between the eighteenth century and the mid-nineteenth century, Italy remained divided into small states, many of them under foreign (Austrian and French) domination: this context did not favor the economic and commercial growth and competitiveness of the Italian area. However, during the 18th century Italian rulers influenced by Enlightenment thought participated in the reformism of those years, implementing a series of economic-social reforms, which partially succeeded in modernizing the socio-economic system. This period of reform was interrupted by the French Revolution, which was replaced by repressive despotic governments. After the Restoration, the various rulers tried to encourage a certain reformism, while suppressing the demands of the liberals, which prevented Italy from entering the Second Industrial Revolution. In fact, it remained an agrarian and backward country compared to other countries of the West, although internally with two levels of backwardness between the North and the South. The differences in the "conditions for development" (infrastructure, credit, and education) were significant, given the small income gap.

The Italian economy continued to be based mainly on agriculture. Agrarian regimes, or systems of land tenure, changed in different ways and to different degrees in different Italian regions, with profound economic and social consequences. In the south, the old feudal system remained dominant until the 1700s and beyond: land was concentrated in the hands of a small number of landowners, known as barons. In central Italy, metayage prevailed: although land ownership was concentrated in the hands of a few, this agrarian contract encouraged the spirit of enterprise and forms of cooperation over time. In the north, feudalism declined sharply in the 1700s, and the first transformations toward capital investment, modernization of production techniques, and integration with manufacturing industries began.

==== Northern Italy ====
Lombardy, dominated by Austria, was the region that managed to implement the best reforms during the 18th century, and this was especially due to the good government of Count Karl Joseph von Firmian, who was governor of the Duchy of Milan during the reign of Maria Theresa and Joseph II of the Holy Roman Empire. Major economic reforms were undertaken during these years: intensive agriculture (with heavy investment in irrigation); production of raw silk along with the spinning industry; abolition of tax privileges; freedom of internal trade; reduction of ecclesiastical power through the abolition of the right of asylum, the Inquisition, and significant investment in public education, such as the reconstruction of the University of Pavia. The most important reform was the introduction in 1718 of the Teresian land cadastre: this reform, which lasted for over forty years, profoundly modernized the agrarian regime. The reforming policy was interrupted in the last decades of the eighteenth century. Later in the nineteenth century, the first engineering industries developed (small but important enterprises including Regazzoni, Elvetica, Grondona, the weapons industries of Brescia, and the ironworks of Lecco and Dongo); numerous banking institutions (including the Cassa di Risparmio delle Province Lombarde founded in 1823); and a well-developed network of rail and road transportation.

In Veneto, dominated by Austria, intensive agriculture could not be developed as in Lombardy and the stagnation caused by the decline of Venice could not be overcome.

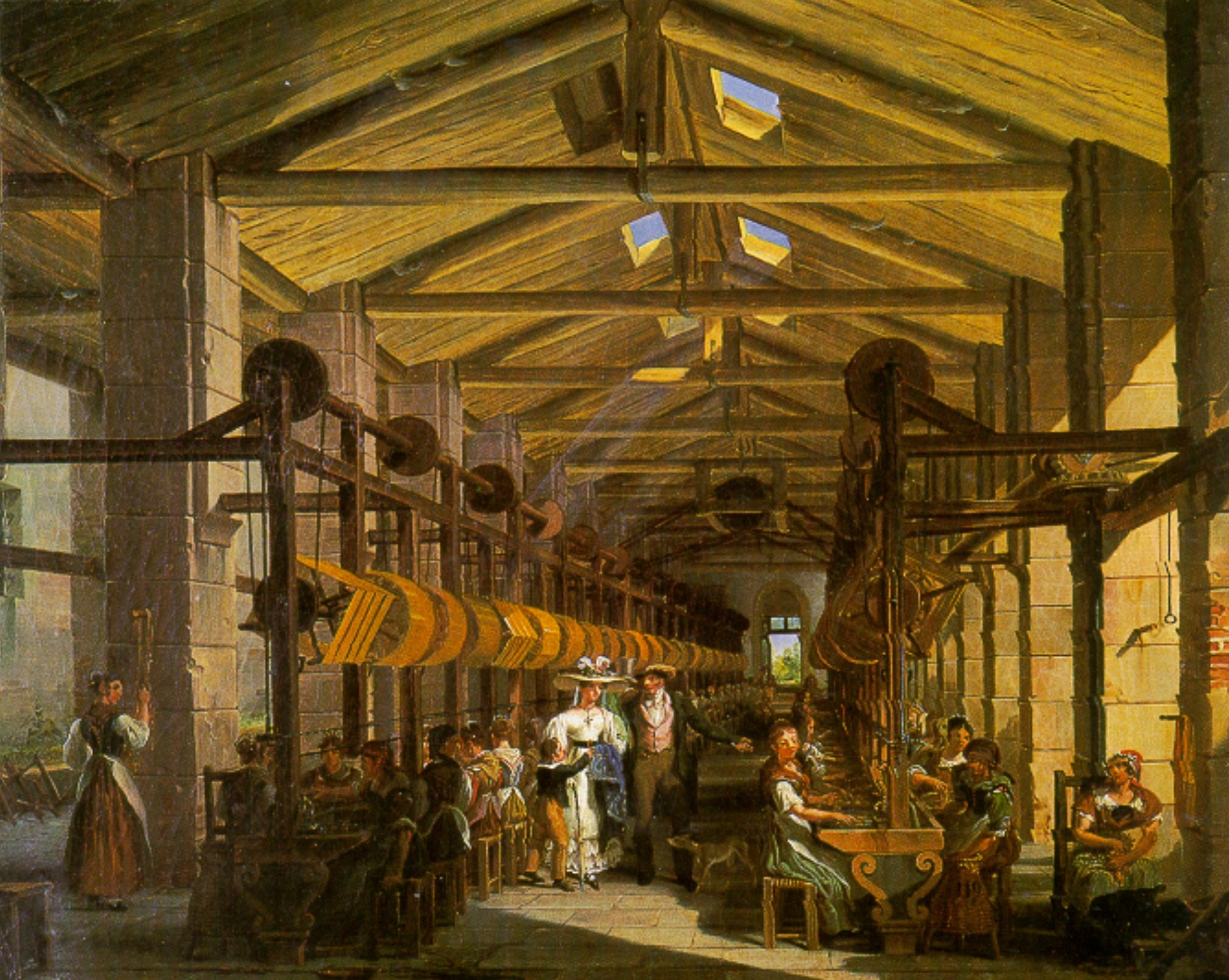
Spinning mill in Boffolara Ticinese: the Mylius Mill, painting by Giovanni Migliara (1828).

Administrative reforms of social and economic significance were also undertaken in Tuscany and Piedmont.

In the Grand Duchy of Tuscany, under Francis of Lorraine and Peter Leopold, important reforms of the legal system were initiated in the 18th century: abolition of feudal jurisdiction and servitude, mortmain and primogeniture; land reclamation works; and religious reform was attempted by the Jansenist bishop Scipione De Ricci. Many of these reforms were greatly weakened and abolished in the late 18th century by his successor, Ferdinand III. Later Tuscany, also dominated by the Austrians under Leopold II, remained essentially an agricultural economy; there were small industries, but the Grand Duchy's highly liberal trade policy did not encourage their development. Livorno took advantage of trade liberalization and became a vibrant free-trade zone. Important reforms were carried out to promote connections through the construction of railroads: the Ferrovia Leopolda (Florence-Pisa-Livorno, with a branch line from Empoli to Siena) and the Ferrovia Maria Antonia (Florence-Prato-Pistoia-Lucca), while the Ferrovia Ferdinanda (Florence-Arezzo) and the Ferrovia Maremmana (Livorno-Chiarone border, completed after 1860) remained in the planning stage. The old Tuscan banking companies, on the other hand, did not evolve with the times.

In eighteenth-century Piedmont, Enlightenment reforms were very weak compared to the other pre-Unitary states, and in fact, unlike Victor Amadeus III, his successors, Charles Emmanuel III and especially Victor Amadeus III, focused more on a series of wars to expand the kingdom's borders than on Enlightenment-style reforms. During the Napoleonic period, important reforms were carried out in the socio-economic field, such as the abolition of feudalism contained in the Napoleonic Codes, which were later repealed by Victor Emmanuel I. After the uprisings of 1820, Charles Felix came to the throne, who, together with his successor Charles Albert, oscillated between reformism and despotism. During these years important reforms were carried out, such as the creation in 1827 of the Cassa di Risparmio di Torino and the Società Reale Mutua d'assicurazioni; the reduction of customs duties on wheat (for which they fell from 9 to 3 lire per quintal), coal, textiles and metals; the facilitation of the import of machinery for industry and the possibility of exporting raw silk. This policy obviously led to a reduction in customs revenues, but it favored other revenues in the state budget, which was in the black for several years from 1835. During the same years in Genoa, the wealth accumulated through centuries of trade remained centralized in a small group of bankers active throughout Europe. In 1845 the Banca di Genova was founded, which later became the Banca Nazionale degli Stati Sardi, named after the unified National Bank of the Kingdom of Italy (later Bank of Italy). There were also a number of important industrial companies (including Ansaldo, the Cantiere della Foce, and the Arsenal). The development of the railroads was slow at first (the first railroad was completed in 1848), but then there were great expansions under the administration of Cavour. After the uprisings of 1848, the Kingdom of Sardinia, unlike the other Italian States, was the only one to maintain the Constitution, reaffirmed in the Statuto Albertino. The new king, Victor Emmanuel II, gave the task of forming a new government to Cavour, who, from 1850 to 1861, initiated reforms that modernized the economy, education, infrastructure, and promoted industrialization and the separation of church and state. Despite resistance and royal influence, the modernization process became more assertive, supported by entrepreneurship, which gradually became more influential in directing political and economic reforms. In the Kingdom of Sardinia, wealth was not limited to the aristocracy, but spread to bankers, merchants and textile entrepreneurs. In Sardinia, on the other hand, the Savoy administration maintained the feudal latifundium for a long time: it was only formally abolished between 1835 and 1839, contributing to the continuation of economic and social backwardness.

==== Papal States ====
The papal administration was also criticized at the time for its patronage and poor governance, which hindered economic modernization and investment. Pius IX ascended to the papacy in 1846, marking the beginning of a period that, despite a brief liberal surge, soon saw a return to conservatism after 1848. However, during his reign, which lasted until 1870, there was moderate but significant investment in transportation infrastructure and land reclamation.

Southern Italy in the eighteenth century

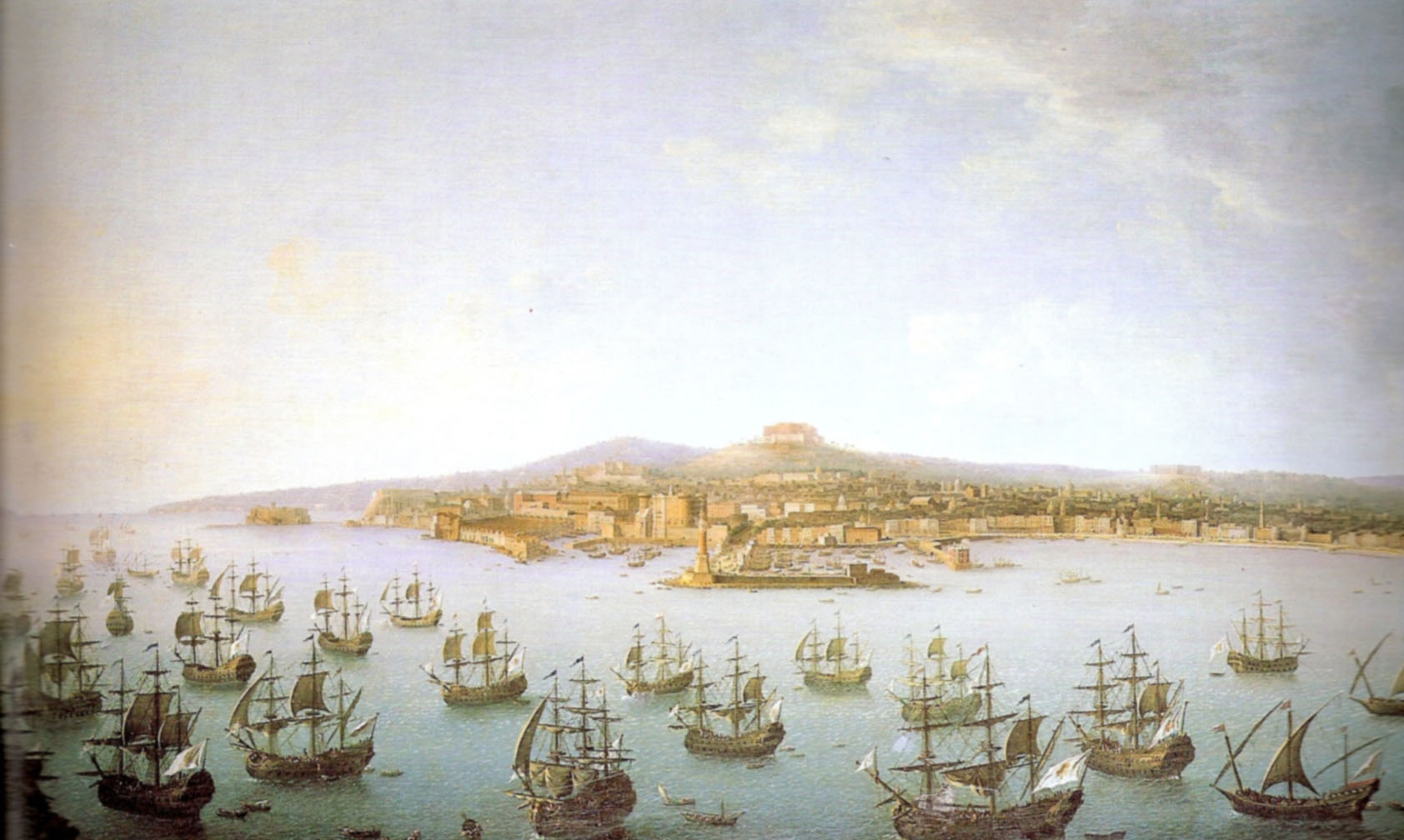
The Departure of Charles III of Bourbon for Spain, as seen from the sea by Antonio Joli.

During the mid-eighteenth century, a series of Enlightenment-style reforms were enacted in the South through the reforming efforts of Charles III of Spain, the first king of the Bourbon dynasty in Naples, and court figures such as Secretaries of State Manuel de Benavides y Aragón, Josè Joaquìn de Montealegre and Bernardo Tanucci and the economists Antonio Serra, Antonio Genovesi, and Ferdinando Galliani; in addition to the jurists Pietro Giannone, Gaetano Filangieri, Giuseppe Maria Galanti, Giuseppe Palmieri, Domenico Grimaldi, and Merchiorre Delfico; and later with the president of the council of ministers Luigi De Medici during the reign of Ferdinand I. These reforms were intended on the one hand to modernize the socio-economic structure of the South by limiting baronial and Church power and on the other to stimulate crafts and enterprise through the opening of new facilities. These laws created a juncture of discontinuity with the past, but did not lead to the abolition of feudalism, a serious problem in the South of Italy.

The reforms

The Court in these years clashed against the omnipotence of the barons; in this direction occurs the recovery of "arredamenti," a term by which is meant a set of public rights such as customs, taxes, production and exchange monopolies, and taxes on stored goods; this policy allowed the decrease of baronial power and the return of leadership in the economic field. The sharpest and most prolonged clash was with the church, which during the viceregal period possessed three immunities: first, local immunity, which allowed anyone who entered a sacred place and sought asylum to escape civil justice; second, personal immunity, which prevented clergymen from being subjected to the courts of the kingdom; and the most economically burdensome, royal immunity, which granted the church's immense lands exemption from taxation. Thus from 1737 negotiations began between the Kingdom of Naples and the Papal States that eventually led to the signing of the Concordat of 1741; this limited the jurisdiction of the clergy, subjected a portion of church property to taxation, and reduced the claim to asylum to limited cases. On November 3, 1767, a decree was submitted for Ferdinand I's signature, by which the expulsion of the Jesuits from Naples and the auctioning of church property took place: more than 45 thousand hectares of land were thus assigned under emphyteusis contracts, benefiting the agrarian middle class; part of this land was given in small fractions to poor peasants: 3 thousand Sicilian families.

Under Charles' reign, an attempt was made to modernize the tax system. His first act was the law of Oct. 4, 1740, by which the compilation of the Catasto onciario was ordered, called onciario because it was the theoretical monetary unit of reference, on the basis of which assets were estimated. The result was a survey of the population of the Kingdom, in which age, profession and property were reported. Copies are preserved in the State Archives of Naples. However, this reform had two limitations: the first limitation was that they were referred to the declarations of the landowners, and the second limitation was that it was controlled by the communes, entities in which the barons and landowners ruled. For these reasons, the reform failed in the following years, and the tax authorities reverted to the taxes. Through these reforms a modernization of the socioeconomic system of the southern society was possible, and in the economic field the opening of the factories of San Leucio, Royal Factory of Capodimonte, Royal Ironworks and Workshops of Mongiana, the Royal Neapolitan Tapestry and the modernization of the shipyards of Naples and Castellammare took place.

During Spanish rule, Sicily was in a very similar condition to the rest of the south of Italy: great economic potential ("in the first half of the 18th century, the island, in a good year, could produce twice as much grain as it consumed.") and had the same problems as the rest of the south, namely baronage and clerical power. Political power was in the hands of the viceroy appointed by the royalty, whose choices were an expression of the government of Madrid at first and of Naples later. The capital was Palermo with 200,000 inhabitants, which was the most populous city in Italy, after Naples, which had 370,000 inhabitants at the end of the eighteenth century. The reformism of the reign of Charles and the early years of Ferdinand I was made possible by Viceroys Fogliani Sforza of Aragon, Marcantonio Colonna and especially Domenico Caracciolo. In religious matters the abolition of the Holy Office, reduction of the number of convents and limitation on the number of religious, as well as expropriation and auctioning of part of ecclesiastical property took place. Against the barons, the revocation of civic uses and the renting of state lands took place, in an attempt to foster the emergence of a middle class, freedom of trade was decreed, and the establishment of agrarian credit took place.

Society

As for the society of the Kingdom of Naples (excluding the Kingdom of Sicily) at the end of the eighteenth century, it consisted of 4,828,914 inhabitants distributed as follows as a social structure: the feudal lords and nobles (who also comprised at the time all or almost all of the officer corps), numbered 31,000; the intellectual bourgeoisie of the liberal professions (mainly lawmen, thus lawyers, judges and notaries, and doctors) numbered 40,400; the male and female clergy comprised 90,659 people, including 64,000 priests, friars, monks and 26,659 nuns. The remaining 4,666,855 people (excluding liberal professions) were farmers, merchants, laborers, artisans, shepherds, and maritime workers. As a percentage, less than 1 percent of the population belonged to the aristocracy, nearly 1 percent to the intellectual bourgeoisie, about 2 percent to the clergy, and 97 percent of the population consisted of the Third Estate. The concentration of estates in very few hands was even more pronounced than what these figures indicate, since within the nobility and clergy there were significant social disproportions. Until at least the beginning of the 19th century there existed the practice in aristocratic households of transferring the estate only to the eldest son, so as to keep it intact. The customs of primogeniture, seniorate and fideicommissum meant that male "cadet" or female children were excluded from inheritance. The 31,000 aristocrats in 1792 were therefore not all large landowners. The military officialdom at that date consisted entirely of nobles, but mostly cadets. These figures were typical of an Ancien Régime state; in fact, society in France and Spain was similarly divided. French society consisted of 2% nobility and clergy, respectively while Spanish society consisted of 2% nobility and 4% clergy, with the remaining part of the population being the Third Estate.

Limits of the reforms and feudalism

The reforms succeeded in partly reforming the South after the years of Spanish and Austrian rule and creating a moment of discontinuity with the past, but they failed to abolish feudalism, a serious problem in the South, and they did not fully modernize the economic and social system of the South. In fact, land ownership, and thus the economy, remained highly concentrated for a long time. It has been estimated that in the late eighteenth century there were about 600 baronial families in the continental South, plus about fifty ecclesiastical barons: the barons accounted for about 1 percent of the total population and held control over more than 70 percent of the rural population in vassalage status. Fifteen families ruled almost a quarter of the feudal population of the Kingdom, or about 700,000 people. An example of the vastness of the fiefdoms is represented by Irpinia; in this province the feudal estate of the Caracciolo family of Avellino, brought together in 1798 a series of baronies covering a total area of 220 square kilometers, or 22,000 hectares, in the same years the feud in Sant'Angelo dei Lombardi was defined as a real state with 245.62 square kilometers, constituting 29% of the territorial surface of that area, it had a population of 20,607 inhabitants, equal to 34.52% of the population of Alta Irpina and 5.58% of the entire province. Not only the nobles owned fiefs but also the sovereign and the royal family, the House of Bourbons of Naples owned both the crown property and the so-called allodial property of the monarch, his personal and direct property, the latter included the following fiefs: Altamura, Borbona, Campli, Cantalice, Castellammare, Cittaducale, Leonessa, Montereale, Ortona a Mare, Penne, Pianella, Posta, Rocca Guglielma, San Giovanni in Carico, San Valentino.

Last decade of the eighteenth century and the Napoleonic period

In the last decade of the eighteenth century, the period of enlightened despotism ended in Naples as well, Ferdinand I dismissed Tanucci and behaved in an increasingly authoritarian manner, fearing that a revolution might break out as in France, and this type of government continued even after the Restoration. Examples of these repressions are the counter-revolution of the Army of the Holy Faith against the Parthenopean Republic and the suppression of the constitutions of 1820 and the uprisings of 1830, although for the most part the socio-economic reforms made during the Napoleonic period were left behind, such as the feudal subversion laws promoted in Naples in 1806.

The South in the nineteenth century

During the Congress of Vienna Ferdinand I reunited the Kingdoms of Naples and Sicily into the Kingdom of the Two Sicilies. Subsequently, with the government of Ferdinand II, a modest process of industrialization developed, mainly involving the large cities Naples, Palermo and Catania. In fact, in these years the first industrial plants were developed in the South, the first railways were built and the number of ships was greatly increased. However, there were considerable problems limiting this progress, which concerned, from the social perspective: the strong hierarchy of society, the centralization of resources and investments in certain areas, a reduced number of land routes and high percentages of illiterates. From an economic point of view, the problems were the low endogenous investment in industrialization, which depended heavily on foreign and public capital, the lack of a modern credit system, and, above all, a primary sector that depended almost exclusively on latifundia.

Reforms

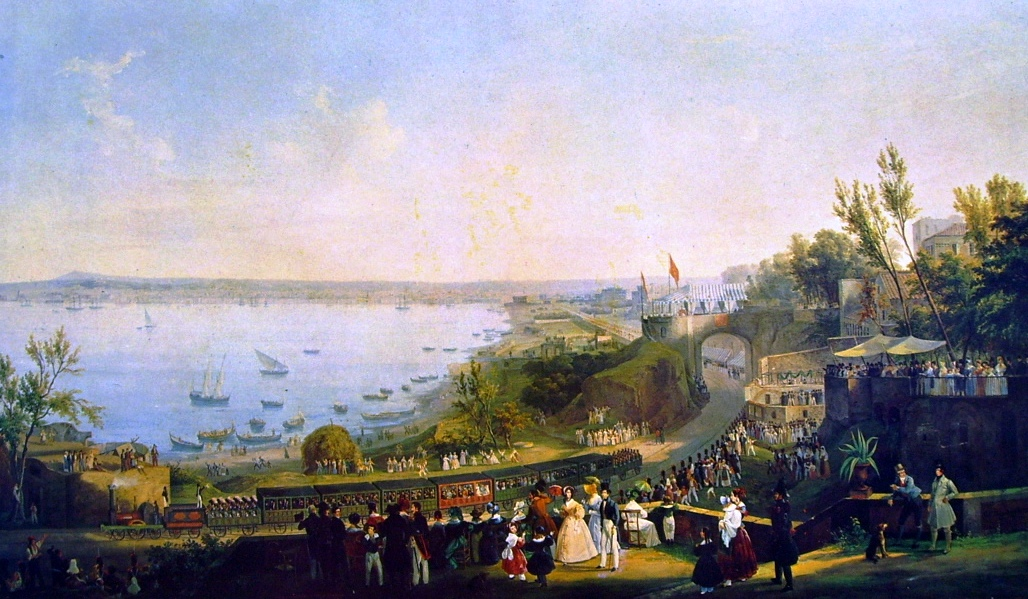
Inauguration of the Naples-Portici railway.

In these years new lines of communication were developed in the south, as can be seen by the construction of the first section of the Italian Railway, the Naples-Portici, in 1839, to which was added another line on the Naples-Castellammare axis, and both lines were served by regular services open to different classes of the population, with special first, second and third class carriages. In 1845 studies began for the ambitious Naples-Brindisi project; in 1856 the Naples-Nola-Sarno line was completed. The development of the railways is not the only sign of modernity: the Real Ferdinando Iron Bridge over the Garigliano, the second on the European continent, was built, followed by the one over the Calore River. Between 1830 and 1856, more than 3,000 miles of consular roads were opened, quadrupling the existing road network.

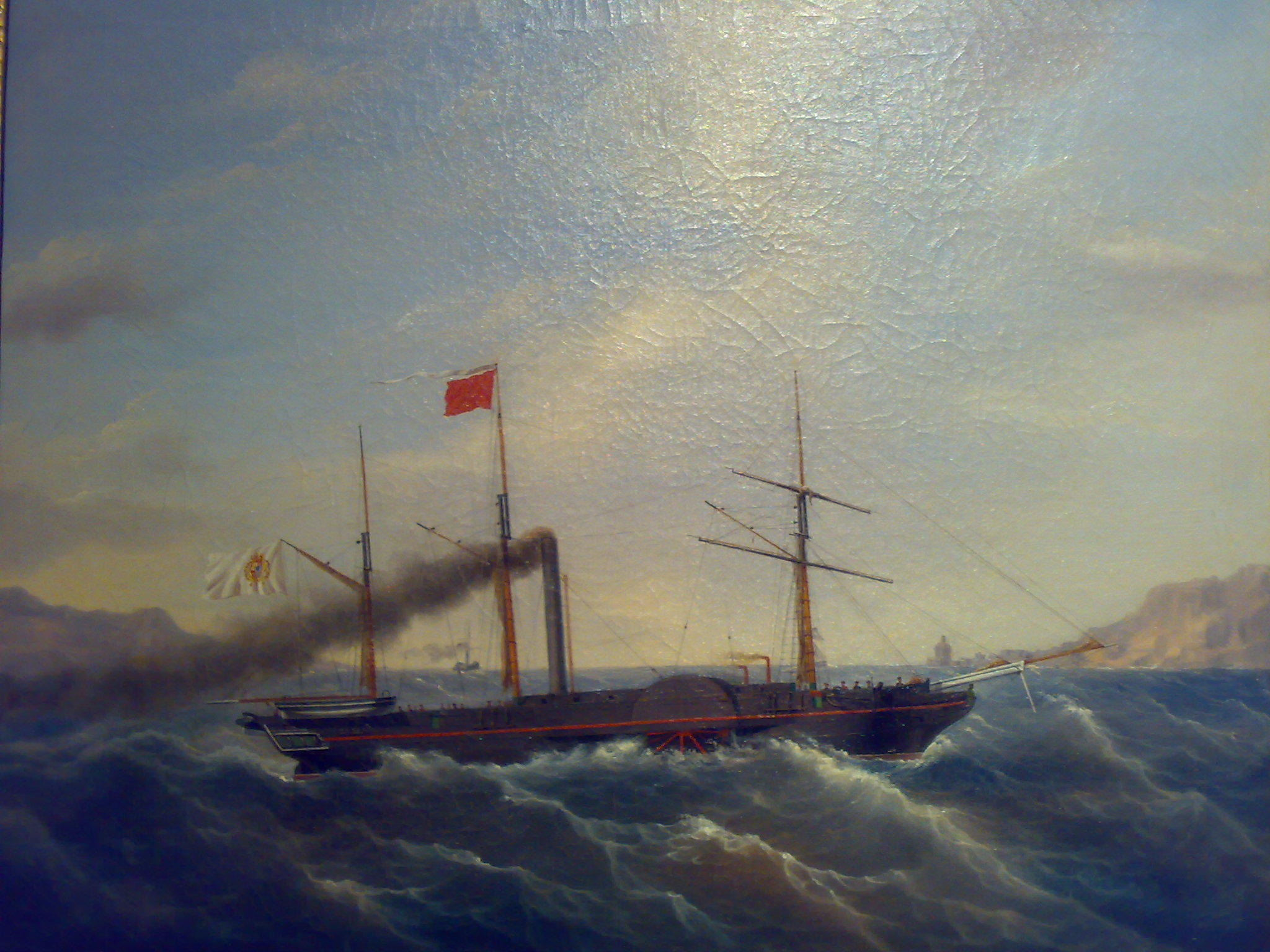
The Ferdinand I was the first steamboat to sail the Mediterranean.

As for shipbuilding in Naples, the first steam ship, the "Ferdinand I", was launched and the improved shipyards of Naples and Castellammare surpassed those of Genoa in tonnage. The shipyards multiplied the number of ships in a few years, from 8,000 tons in 1824 to 100,000 tons in 1835 and then to 250,000 tons in 1860. At the same time, the attention given to the ports increased with the creation of new docks: in Castellammare, Gallipoli, Molfetta, Gaeta, Ortona, Barletta, Ischia and Bari.

Investment in the roads fostered the development of industry, in 1835 there were 117 woolen mills, the Lefebvre and Polsinelli paper mills, employing over a thousand workers. The development of mechanical engineering activity lagged behind, with the development of activity by privately owned industries such as the Marcy and Henry, the Zino and Henry Works, the Guppy and Pattinson, Royal Ironworks and Mongiana Workshops, and above all, of the publicly owned Pietrarsa Workshops, which constituted the largest industrial complex in Italy.

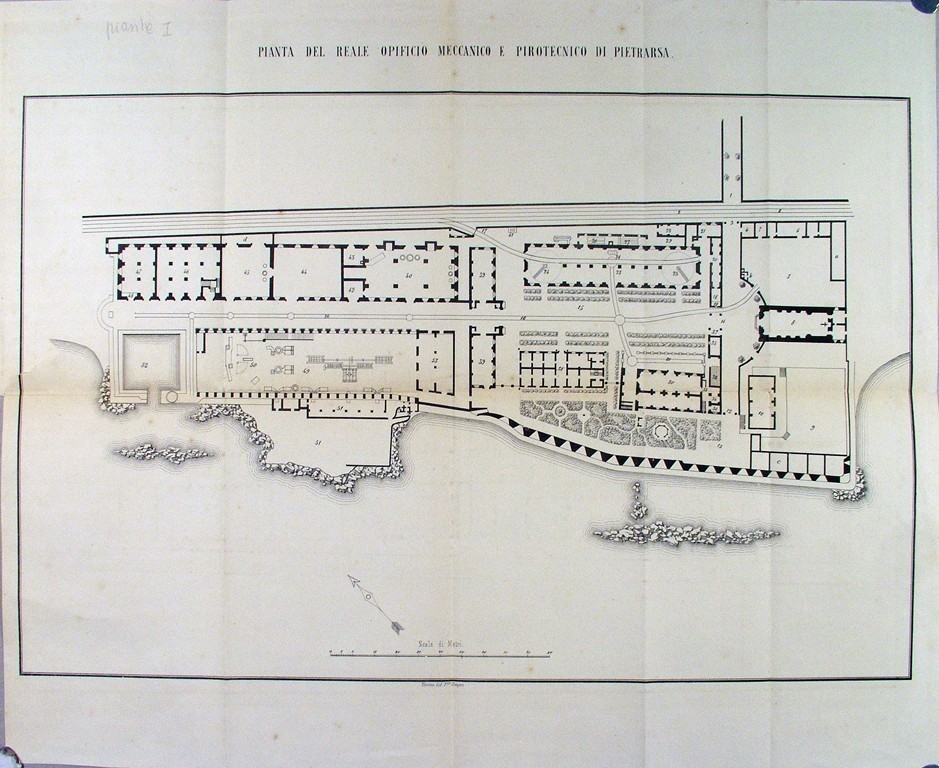
Plan of the Reale Opificio meccanico e pirotecnico di Pietrarsa, published in the volume Sullo stabilimento metallurgico e meccanico di Pietrarsa, Turin 1861. Report of Sebastiano Grandis, inspector of the State Railroads.

Mining activity thrived, and sulfur mines were managed by French and British investments, covering 80 percent of world demand.

Credit institutions

Very little was done on the credit front - the banks were few in number, of which the most important one was the Banco delle Due Sicilie, a state credit institution that was created by Joachim Murat from the merger of eight public banks. It was supported by the Banco fruttuaria (1831-1857), Banco del tavoliere (1834-1839) and Banco dell'ofanto, which had difficulty competing with the state bank and eventually collapsed.

In order to stimulate the development of the lower classes, attempts were made to create savings banks. These were credit institutions that sought to entice the humbler classes to save. Two were established - one in Naples and another in Palermo. The initiative, however, failed to be as successful as hoped due to both lack of funds and the aversion of the population.

On the other hand, the monti frumentari were successful, which were enlarged and further new ones were founded, so that the Kingdom came to have 700 of them on the mainland alone. Their purpose was to administer seed to peasants whose price was returned at a very low interest rate, thus on the one hand promoting the development of agriculture and on the other increasing social cohesion and decreasing possible revolts. To prevent the development of usury, the monti pecuniari were established in 1833, the aim of which was to lend small sums of money at low interest (no more than ten ducats at 6 percent interest).

Society

In these years the economy of the South developed into a highly hierarchical economy, at the top of which were the foreign bourgeoisie, who often became bankers due to the scarcity of credit institutions; in fact, the figure of the merchant banker was created; they were the Rothschilds of Naples, top creditors of the State, the Swiss bankers Meuricoffre and Appelt, several English merchants, Ingham-Whitaker, Woodhouse, Close, Rogers and others. The minority partners were the Neapolitan and Sicilian investors: Volpicelli, Ricciardi, Buono, Falanga, De Martino, Montuori, Sorvillo and Florio. The latter achieved important economic successes and managed to become important partners. During these years, a southern bourgeoisie developed, especially in the countryside, derived from the military and clerical class, which had been granted important concessions in the Murattian period; in later years it merged with the nobility to form a single social class called "galantuomini", but this did not bring about major changes in the agrarian system, which remained linked to the "unsuccessful latifundium". An insight into the society of the south can be given by data relating to the city of Naples, which in 1840 had 400,813 inhabitants, socially distributed as follows: 16,878 landowners (5 percent), 7142 professionals (2 percent), 11,167 civil servants (4 percent), 18,148 military personnel (6 percent), 11,902 pensioners (4 percent), 6610 clergymen (2 percent), 2830 working in charities (0.7 percent), 80,457 merchants, artisans, labourers, etc. (25 percent), 168,052 day labourers, peddlers, beggars, etc. (41 percent). The last category includes the lazzari. For historical reasons and due to the absolutist and centralising nature of the Bourbon monarchy, a large part of the population on the other side of the lighthouse, i.e. in the former Kingdom of Naples, was concentrated in the capital. In 1848 Naples and its surroundings had 495,942 inhabitants, i.e. 7.6% of the population of the Kingdom on the other side of the lighthouse. As a result of centralisation, the majority of workers in the bureaucracy and trade were in the capital. The distribution of workers in the non-insular south in 1848 was as follows: of the 30,677 clerks, 11,740 were employed in Naples (38.26%); of the 3,702 lawyers, 3,036 (82%) were in the capital; of the 39,996 merchants of the former Kingdom of Naples, 13,407 (33.53%) were in the capital, 37,275 were seamen, of whom 8,338 (22.36%) had their offices in Naples, and of the 312,219 workers and artisans in Naples and surrounding areas, 102,947 were residents (32.98%).

The total number of poor people in 1820 in the non-island south alone was 189,686 (3.3%); according to other sources, forty years later the number of beggars in the whole kingdom was one hundred and twenty thousand, or 1.4% of the population, lower than in Lombardy (1.6%), Romagna (2.11%), Umbria (2.14%) and Tuscany (1.83%).

Limits of reforms and latifundism

While it is undeniable that the Kingdom of the Two Sicilies went through reforms that favored a partial industrialization process in the early years of Ferdinand II's reign, it is also important to remember the limits of these policies. The first limitation relates to the fact that the period of reforms from 1830 to May 15, 1848, the date when the repression of constitutional reforms due to the January 1848 uprisings that had led to the approval of the kingdom's constitution began, the events of May 15 had alienated the Neapolitan intelligentsia and Italian liberals who began to despise the Bourbons, and the dynamism of the early years was curbed by an economic policy that was more sparing than Cavour's draconian economy but was certainly more fruitful in the long run. The second limitation relates to the fact that the Kingdom of the Two Sicilies continued to have an economy centered on agriculture although with a modest secondary and tertiary sector, the primary sector employed 62 percent of the labor force, the secondary and tertiary both employed 19 percent of the population. The third limitation also concerns the lack of development of a strong industrial bourgeoisie, for the vast majority of industries were built by foreign and public capital, and the southern bourgeoisie tended to engage more in agriculture, trade and intellectual work. This is not only due to the lack of dynamism of the southern intelligentsia but also due to the few private lending institutions. The fourth limitation concerns the hinterland of the south, where the state failed to encourage the development of a modern primary sector, which remained the backbone of the southern economy: apart from a few exceptions, such as the wine cellars of Florio or the tuna fishery of Favignana, much of the south was cultivated as latifundia, with backward and unsuccessful agricultural techniques. It is estimated that at the end of the 18th century, 650 secular and ecclesiastical latifundia controlled 60 per cent of the national product of the continental south, and the reforms of the sale of uncultivated and ecclesiastical land often served to further enrich the bourgeois families of the military and administrative classes, who had increased their power during and after the Napoleonic period. The hegemony of the latifundium in the south is confirmed by the example of Catania, which in the first half of the 19th century had a land distribution in which 51 per cent of the territory belonged to estates with an average size of around 200 hectares and 31 per cent to estates of over 800 hectares. However, the Catania area was one of the least concentrated in Sicily in terms of latifundia. Cadastral holdings of more than 1,000 hectares alone accounted for 45 per cent of the land in the Caltanissetta area and 25 per cent in the Enna area. In the municipality, the possessions of the duke, the former feudal lord, alone covered about half of the 30,000 hectares of the entire municipal territory. Most of the land in the other half was in the hands of 19 owners. The duke and the other landowners, 20 people, owned 81 per cent of the land. The medium estate covered 8 per cent of the area and was divided into 87 cadastral farms. Finally, the smallholdings covered 11% of the area and had a very high degree of fragmentation into tiny plots, divided into 3759 cadastral plots, whose average size was less than one hectare and which did not allow the creation of independent farms. Small or very small landowners could therefore only cultivate land as an adjunct to another occupation, usually working on land owned by others. The pyramidal structure of Bronte's landholdings and social structure can be seen from these figures: the duke owned about 50 per cent of the land; 19 landowners owned more than 30 per cent; 87 medium landowners owned 8 per cent; and finally 3759 cadastral companies shared the remaining 11 per cent.

=== The condition of Italy at the time of unification ===
According to most economic historians, at the time of the unification of Italy there were socio-economic differences between the north-west and the rest of the country, but these became more pronounced from the early twentieth century and have since been exacerbated. At the time of unification, there were small differences in the primary sector, especially in wheat yields, which were, for example, between 5-9 quintals per hectare in the north, 4-8 in the centre and 3-7 in the south between 1815 and 1880.

As Piero Bevilacqua wrote, "at the time of the unification of Italy, the distances between the North and the South were not as significant in terms of industrial structure as they would later become". In fact, in certain industries, such as engineering, tanning, paper and sulphur, the south was not at a disadvantage at all. Stefano Fenoaltea's research, in particular, has shown that the North's advantage only began to emerge and be consolidated at the end of the nineteenth century and not before. In 1871 there was a modest northern advantage: per capita industrial production was 63 lire in the north and 57 in the south. Lombardy, Piedmont and Liguria were in an advantageous position, but Campania and Sicily were in the same situation. Almost all of the centre and south were below the national average, although the deviation from the average was modest.

Normalized index of industrialization of Italian provinces in 1871 (1 is the national average). Source: Bank of Italy. over 1.4 1.1 to 1.4 from 0.9 to 1.1 up to 0.9

At the time of unification, services were more important than industry in terms of total value added, accounting for just under 30 per cent of total output. In Italy as a whole, the proportion of the population working in the service sector would be between 16 and 17 per cent. In 1861 the North would have an advantage over the South (18 to 15 per cent); in 1871 the South would have an advantage; in 1881 there would be parity. Emanuele Felice's data on the value added by services in 1891 show a considerable gap of around 40 per cent between the north-central and the south, but this is due to the presence of the capital in Lazio, where services had a significant weight and contributed a great deal to the gap. In fact, the gap is reduced to 25% if Lazio is excluded. In 1891, i.e. when more reliable data on regional differences in per capita product are available, the South was 15 to 20 percent ahead of the North in terms of agricultural product in the same year. The difference in services per capita was 30-40 per cent in favour of the North. In terms of industrial product, again on a per capita basis, the North had a 10 per cent advantage in 1881, which increased to 30 per cent by 1901.

However, the economic historians Paolo Malanima and Vittorio Daniele were able to calculate that in 1891 the North's advantage over the South in terms of per capita product was between 5 and 10 per cent, whereas in 1861 it was almost non-existent. The estimates are disputed by the economist Emanuele Felice, according to whom two critical points emerge in the estimates of Daniele and Malanima: the first concerns the calculation of the total regional GDP, which is estimated on the basis of the population of the time, but with the current regional boundaries, so that it greatly increases the value of, for example, Campania (which in 1891 would rise from 97 to 110) and collapses that of Lazio (in the same year from 137 to 105). This is due to the fact that Campania lost important territories that Lazio gained, namely the provinces of Latina and Frosinone. As a result, Campania's GDP per inhabitant in the liberal era increased because the total GDP, which included a larger population including Latina and Frosinone, was divided by a smaller number of inhabitants excluding Latina and Frosinone, while Lazio's collapsed because the total GDP related to a smaller population and was divided by a higher number of inhabitants.

The second bias in favour of the South is due to the use of industry based on Fenoaltea's preliminary estimate, which greatly underestimates the North-South gap because it does not take into account productivity differences.

Having made these assumptions, Felice estimated the total GDP gap in 1870 to be 19 per cent; in fact, if Italy were worth 100, the south would have had a GDP per inhabitant of 90 and the north-centre 106. Felice was also able to calculate the average income based on 2011 prices, which was only 2,049 euros per year. A southerner earned on average 1,844 euros a year, or about 154 euros a month (5 euros a day); a north-centre citizen 2,172 euros, or 181 euros a month (6 euros a day).

Felice agrees, however, that there were important differences within the south. In the south, the supremacy of Campania, the ancient capital region, home to Italy's most populous city and wealthy southern landowners, stood out: out of 100, its GDP per capita was 107, above the national average. It was followed by Sicily (94), a region with a strong urban fabric, significant tertiary activity and diversified agriculture, and Puglia (89), thanks to agriculture. This is followed by Abruzzo and Molise with 80, Sardinia with 78, Calabria with 69 and Basilicata with 67. In the north-centre we find Lazio with 146, then a smaller region that almost only occupies the province of Rome. Lazio's GDP is very high because, in the pre-industrial states, the capitals were even more important than they are today, since services were concentrated there, which had a higher income differential with industry and agriculture than is the case today. Consequently, the smaller the area of the region, the higher the GDP. After Lazio we have Liguria 139, the first region in the future industrial triangle, which also channeled an important share of services as well as a nascent industry, followed by Lombardy 111. Then came the other regions, all around the national average, with the exception of Marche (82), last in the Centre-North and almost at the same level as Abruzzo and Molise.

Felice therefore agrees with Malanima and Daniele on the lack of a clear north-south dichotomy, but, unlike the two scholars, he states that the gap is still wider than previously calculated and that there is no east-west difference, although he notes that the highest incomes were concentrated in the most urbanised regions with the oldest manufacturing tradition, usually on the Tyrrhenian side.

Felice also calculated GDP for other Italian regions in 1871, taking into account that Italy is equal to 100: Piedmont 103, Veneto 101, Abruzzo and Molise 80, Liguria 139, Emilia-Romagna 95, Campania 107, Lombardy 111, Tuscany 105, Apulia 89, Marche 82, Basilicata 67, Umbria 99, Calabria 69, Lazio 146, Sicily 94, Sardinia 78. Similarly, North-West 111, North-East and Centre 103, North-Centre 106, South and Islands 90.

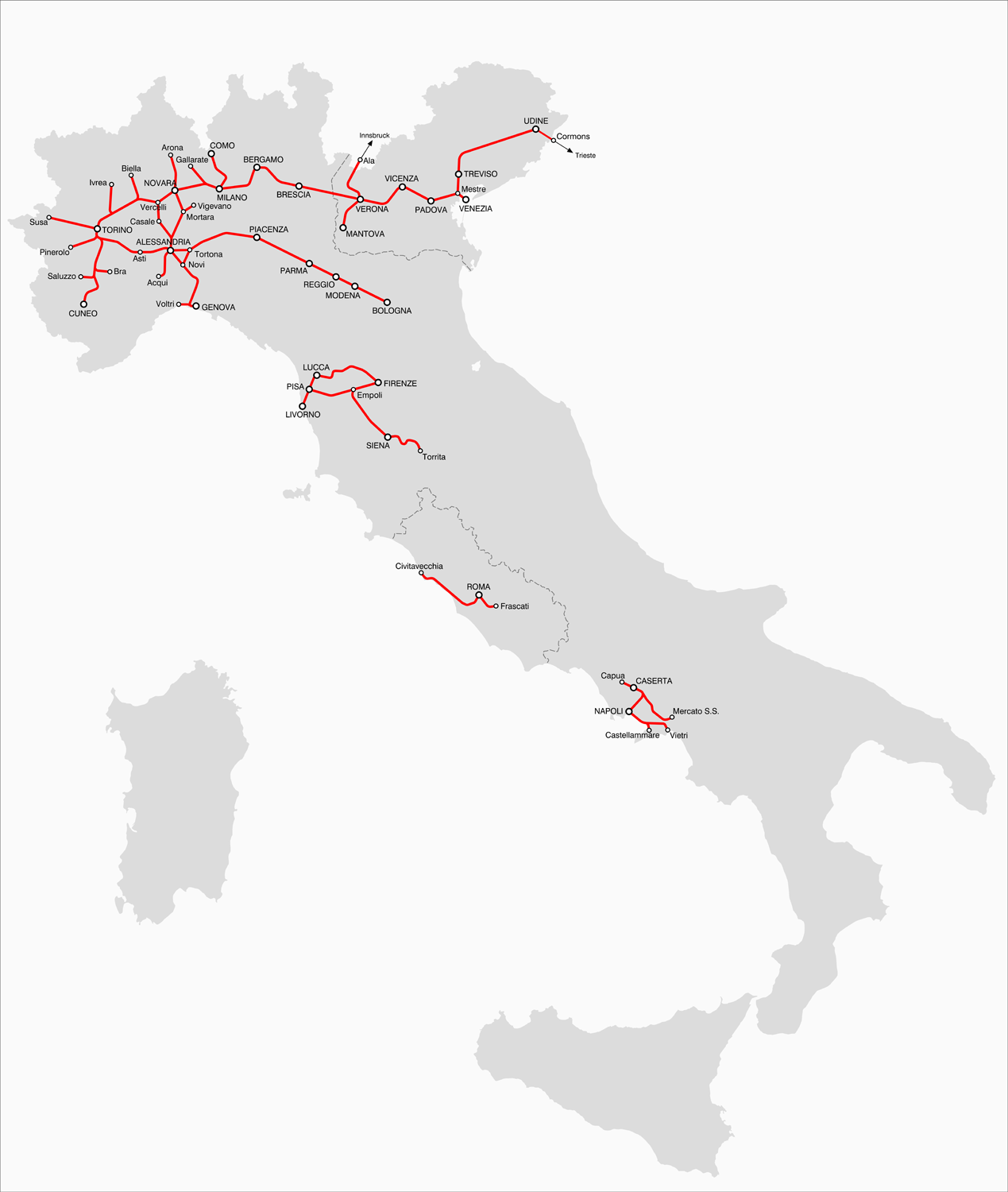
When the Kingdom of Italy was proclaimed in 1861, there were 2,521 km of railways in operation on the peninsula (at the same time there were 11,000 km in Germany, 14,600 in England and 4,000 in France). On the eve of unification in 1859, there were 819 km of railways in Piedmont, 522 km in Lombardy-Venetia, 257 km in the Papal States, 101 km in the Grand Duchy of Tuscany and 99 km in the Kingdom of the Two Sicilies.

In addition to back-calculating GDP per capita in the macro-regions and individual regions in 1871, Felice tries to do the same with data for the macro-regions in 1861. Given that Italy's growth in the 1860s was almost zero, the rate of increase in GDP per capita was actually less than 0.4 per cent per annum, and he assessed the negative impact of the liberal policy, which damaged industry in the south of Italy, which was less productive, but also favoured exports from agriculture, especially high value crops (vines, olives, fruit and vegetables) in Puglia and Sicily, but also in Calabria and the Vulture area (Basilicata), and the associated agro-industry, as well as in Abruzzo and Campania, although he also assessed the damage caused by the civil war, known as "brigandage". Accordingly, he hypothesised that the regional figures for 1860 must have been lower than those for 1870 in Apulia, Sicily and Abruzzo, which had benefited more from liberal policies and suffered less from brigandage, and higher or stable in Campania, Calabria and Basilicata, the first region being the one most affected by liberal policies due to the greater concentration of industry and the other two being the regions where the repression of brigandage raged most.

Having made these assumptions, Felice hypothesises that in 1861 the South's total was about 85 per cent of the national average, which is four or five points lower than it was a decade later (having grown more, its starting point was lower). However, with a margin of uncertainty of 5%, he concludes that at the time of the unification of Italy, the GDP of the South was around 80-90% of the Italian average, i.e. (narrowing the range to round up) between 75-80% of that of the Centre-North.

In 2010, Vera Zamagni summarised the available research on the post-unification Italian economy and regional disparities by writing: "In the pre-industrial age, we cannot expect to find large differences in per capita national product between different agricultural regions. However, it is very important to examine other indicators that can explain why one area, which has a similar per capita income to another, is able to take off at some point thanks to the dynamism of the industrial sector, while the other remains stagnant".

Subsequently, since the Risorgimento was mainly driven by ideal and cultural factors rather than economic ones, without taking into account the various regional specificities and the weakness of the newly formed Kingdom of Italy, and by the development of Piedmontization, that is to say, a very centralised economic-administrative model, which greatly increased regional disparities, without a policy of land redistribution, an immense problem for the South, which maintained the latifundia until the Extraordinary Law no. 841 of 21 October 1950; the economic disparities between the north-west and the rest of the country were initially exacerbated and were only partially bridged during the economic boom, but strong differences remain to this day, especially between the north and south of the country.

== See also ==
- Economic history of Italy
- Economy of Italy
- Southern Question

== Bibliography ==
- Bevilacqua, Piero. Breve storia dell'Italia meridionale.
- Oliva, Gianni. Un Regno che é stato grande in Oscar Saggi. Mondadori.
- Fenoaltea, Stefano. L'economia italiana dall'unità alla grande guerra.
- Cipolla, Carlo Maria (1997). Storia facile dell'economia italiana dal Medioevo ad oggi. Mondadori. OCLC 797692676.
- Silvia A. Conca Messina (2016). Profitti del potere: Stato ed economia nell'Europa moderna. Roma/Bari: Laterza.
- Felice E. (2015). Ascesa e declino: storia economica d'Italia. Il Mulino.
- Felice, Emanuele (2016). Perché il Sud è rimasto indietro. Il Mulino.
- "La dinamica secolare di un "modello italiano"". Il medioevo dal crollo al trionfo. Vol. 1. Torino: Einaudi. 1990.
- Gianni Toniolo; Carlo Bastasin (2020). La strada smarrita. Breve storia dell'economia italiana. Editori Laterza. OCLC 1143473285.
- Zamagni, Vera (2005). Introduzione alla storia economica d'Italia. Il Mulino.
- Vittorio Daniele; Paolo Malanima. Alle origini del divario (PDF). Archived from the original (PDF) on 2023-08-04.
