= Severino Grattoni =

Italian engineer and statesman

Severino Grattoni (9 December 1815 – 1 April 1876) was an Italian engineer and statesman.

He is best known for working with Sebastiano Grandis and Germain Sommeiller in the Traforo del Cenisio (the Fréjus Rail Tunnel, also called the Mont Cenis Tunnel, linking France and Italy). He was born in Voghera. Later in life, he served in scientific missions abroad for the Count of Cavour.
