= Germain Sommeiller =

Italian politician

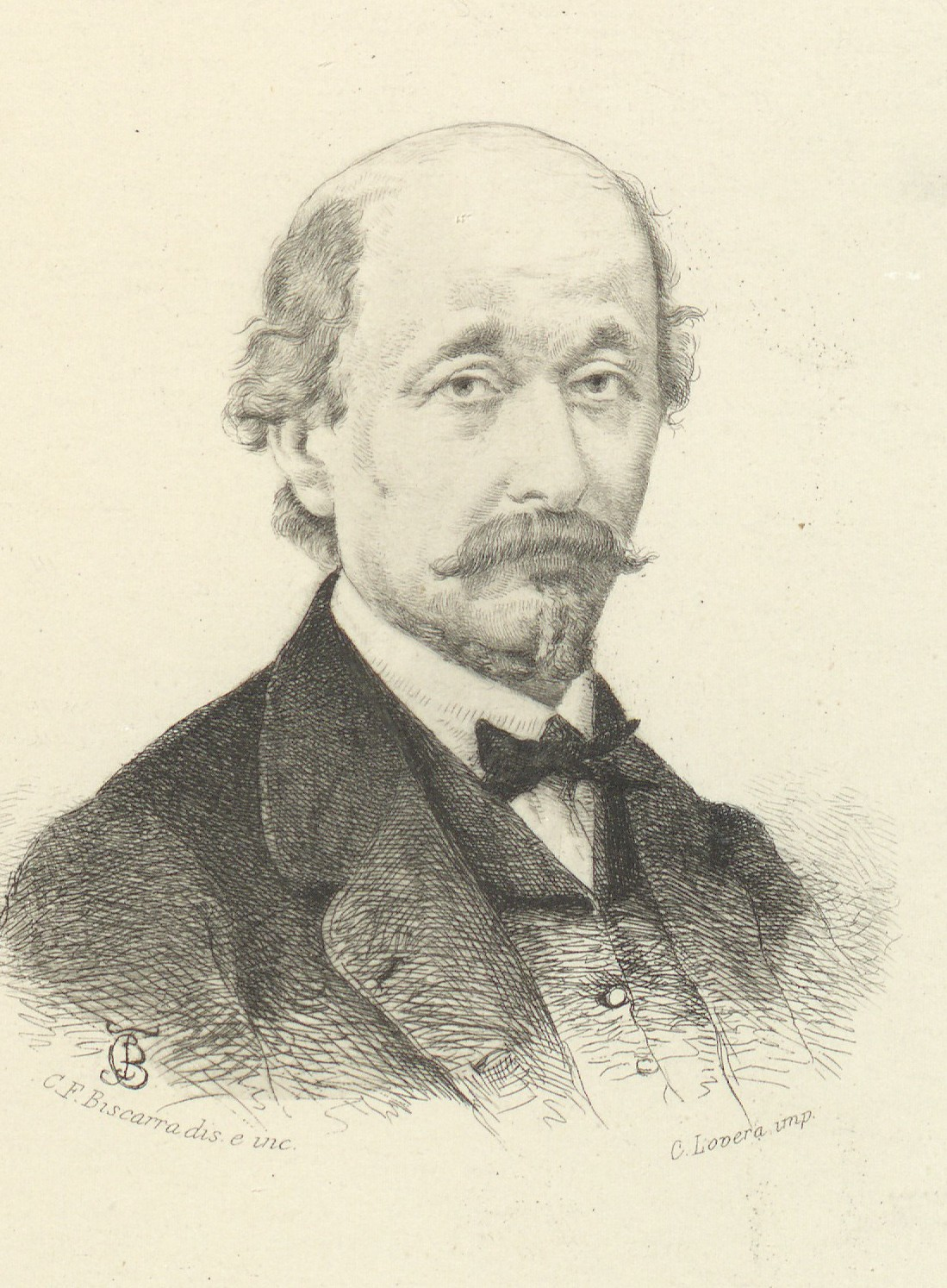
Germain Sommeiller

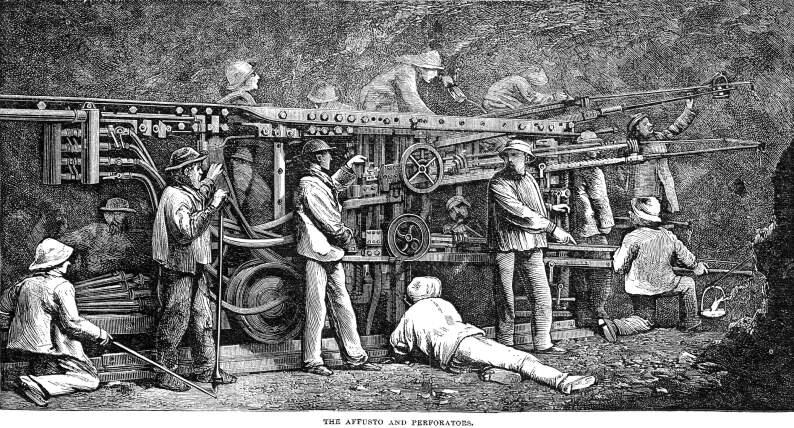
Sommeiller's pneumatic rock-drilling machine

Germain Sommeiller (February 15, 1815, in Saint-Jeoire – July 11, 1871) was an Italian civil engineer from Savoy. He directed the construction of the Fréjus Rail Tunnel between France and Italy, also known as the Mont Cenis Tunnel. This was the first of a series of major tunnels built in the late 19th century to connect northern and southern Europe through the Alps. Sommeiller pioneered the use of pneumatic drilling and dynamite to achieve record-breaking excavation speeds. This 13.7km tunnel was completed on 26 December 1870, 11 years ahead of schedule. It remained the longest tunnel in the world until the opening of the Gotthard Rail Tunnel in 1882.

== Life ==
Germain Sommeiller was born in Saint-Jeoire (now part of Haute-Savoie, France) on 15 February 1815. He graduated in civil engineering at the University of Turin in 1841. He became a Royal Civil Engineer in the Public Transport Department of Savoy in 1845. From 1846 to 1850 he worked for the Cockerill steel company in Liège, which helped build the Belgian rail network. He met his future partner Sebastiano Grandis there. He then returned to Savoy as assistant to the Belgian engineer Henri Maus, who directed the construction of the Turin-Genoa railway.

He was recognised for outstanding technical skills, so when king Vittorio Emanuele II decided to build the Mont Cenis Tunnel between Bardonecchia and Modane in 1857, Sommeiller was appointed head of design and construction. His collaborators were the Italian engineers Sebastiano Grandis and Severino Grattoni. He patented the pneumatic rock-drilling machine, used in the tunnelling works, based on the invention of Giovanni Battista Piatti.

== Politics ==
When Savoy was annexed to France in 1860, Someiller chose to become an Italian rather than a French citizen. He was subsequently elected a member of the first Italian Parliament.

== Death ==
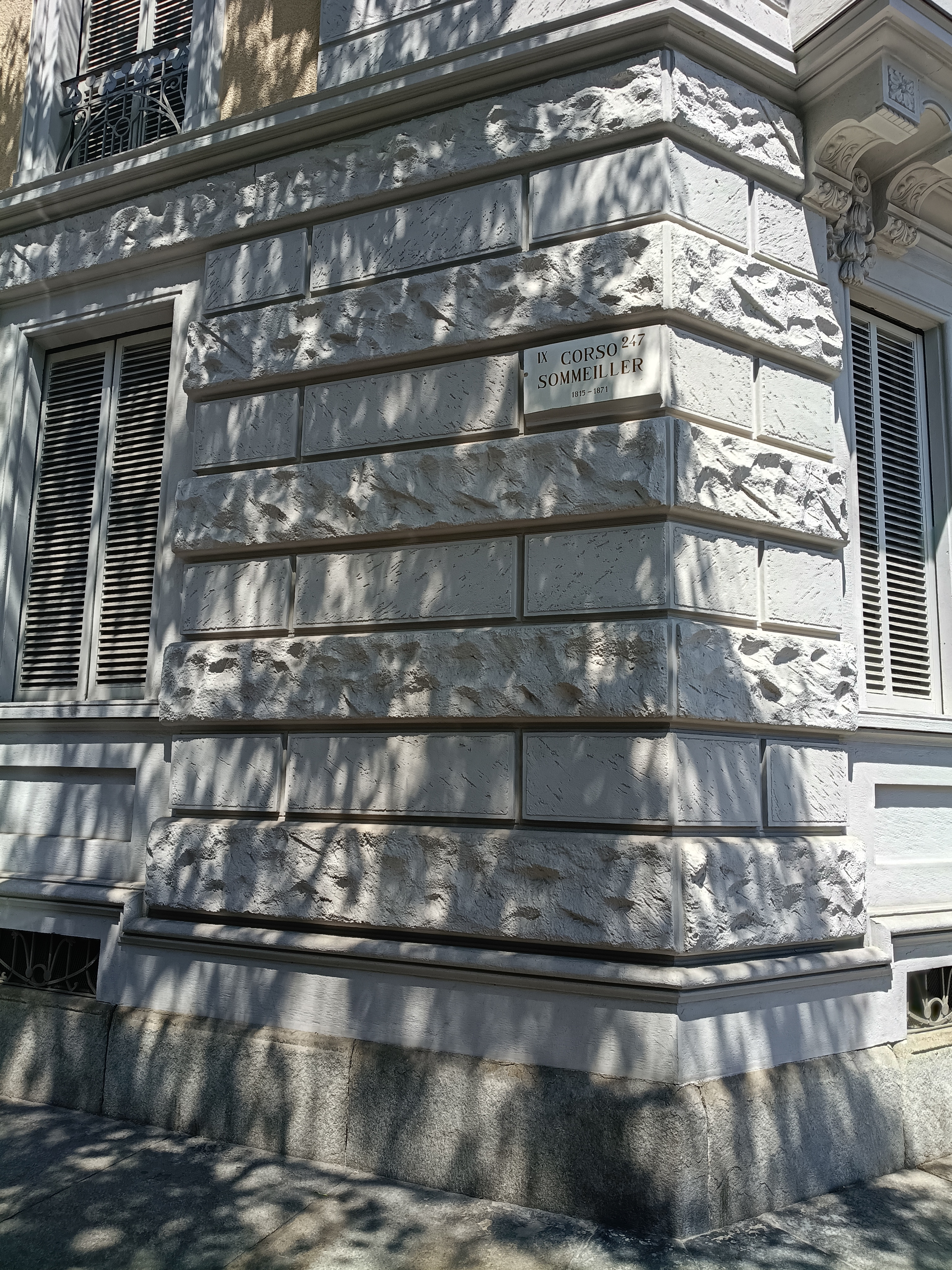
Civil Engineer Corso "Germain Sommeiller" in Turin Italy.jpg

Germain Sommeiller died in his native town of Saint-Jeoire on 11 July 1871, six months after the December 1870 completion of the tunnel. Pointe Sommeiller, a 3332-metre-high peak in the Cottian Alps, and Col Sommeiller, the nearby mountain pass linking Bramans, France to Bardonecchia, Italy, were named in his honour. Several streets in Savoy cities such as Annecy also bear Sommeiller's name.
