= Giovanni Battista Piatti =

Italian civil engineer (1812–1867)

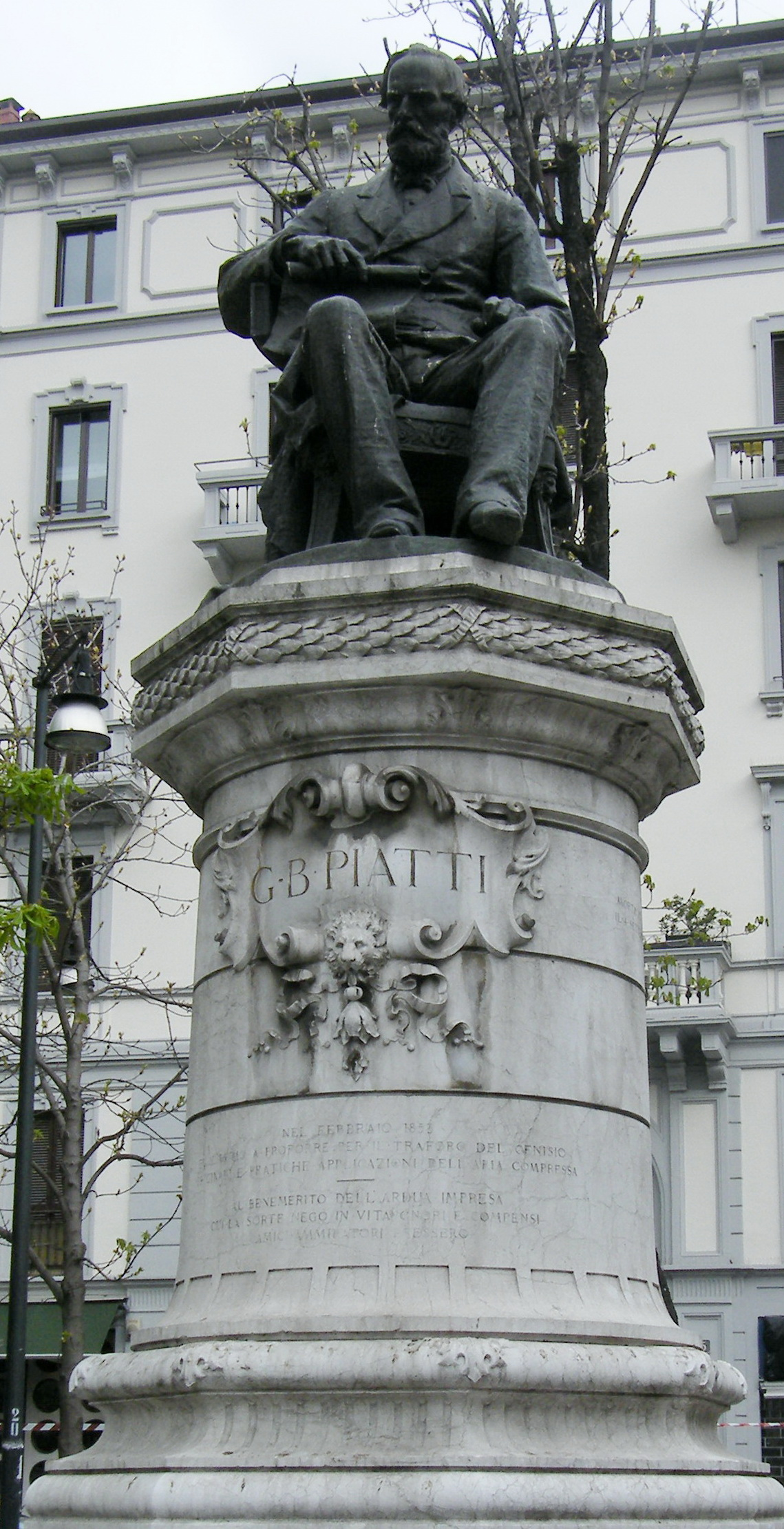
Piatti's statue in Milan sculpted by Salvatore Pisani

Giovanni Battista Piatti (Milan, February 10, 1812 - Milan, September 4, 1867) was an Italian civil engineer from Milan.

== Life ==
He invented a pneumatic rock-drilling machine that, with small modifications, was used in the Mont Cenis Tunnel. On 12 February 1853, he conceived how to carry out the excavation work, using compressed air, and published:

"Proposal for the railroad between Susa and Modane of a new system of propulsion with air compressed hydraulic motors (system experimented in England) and first draft of plan for excavation of the Alps".

He did not achieve fame during his life, since the invention was patented by Germain Sommeiller, but his work was recognized, especially by the architect Luca Beltrami, and admirers constructed a monument dedicated to him in Milan, at Largo La Foppa, remembering that:

"In February 1853 he was the first to propose for the Mont Cenis Tunnel original and practical applications of compressed air, [thus] distinguishing himself in that demanding enterprise".

== Bibliography ==
- Giovanni Battista Piatti, Proposta per la strada ferrata tra Susa e Modane di un nuovo sistema di propulsione ad aria compressa da motori idraulici (sistema esperimentato in Inghilterra) e abbozzo di progetto pel traforamento delle Alpi, Turin, Castellazzo e Gabetti, 1853 (52 p., with 3 tables)
