= Salvatore Pisani =

Italian sculptor (1859–1920)

Salvatore Pisani (July 20, 1859 in Mongiana, Calabria – September 18, 1920 in Milan) was an Italian sculptor.

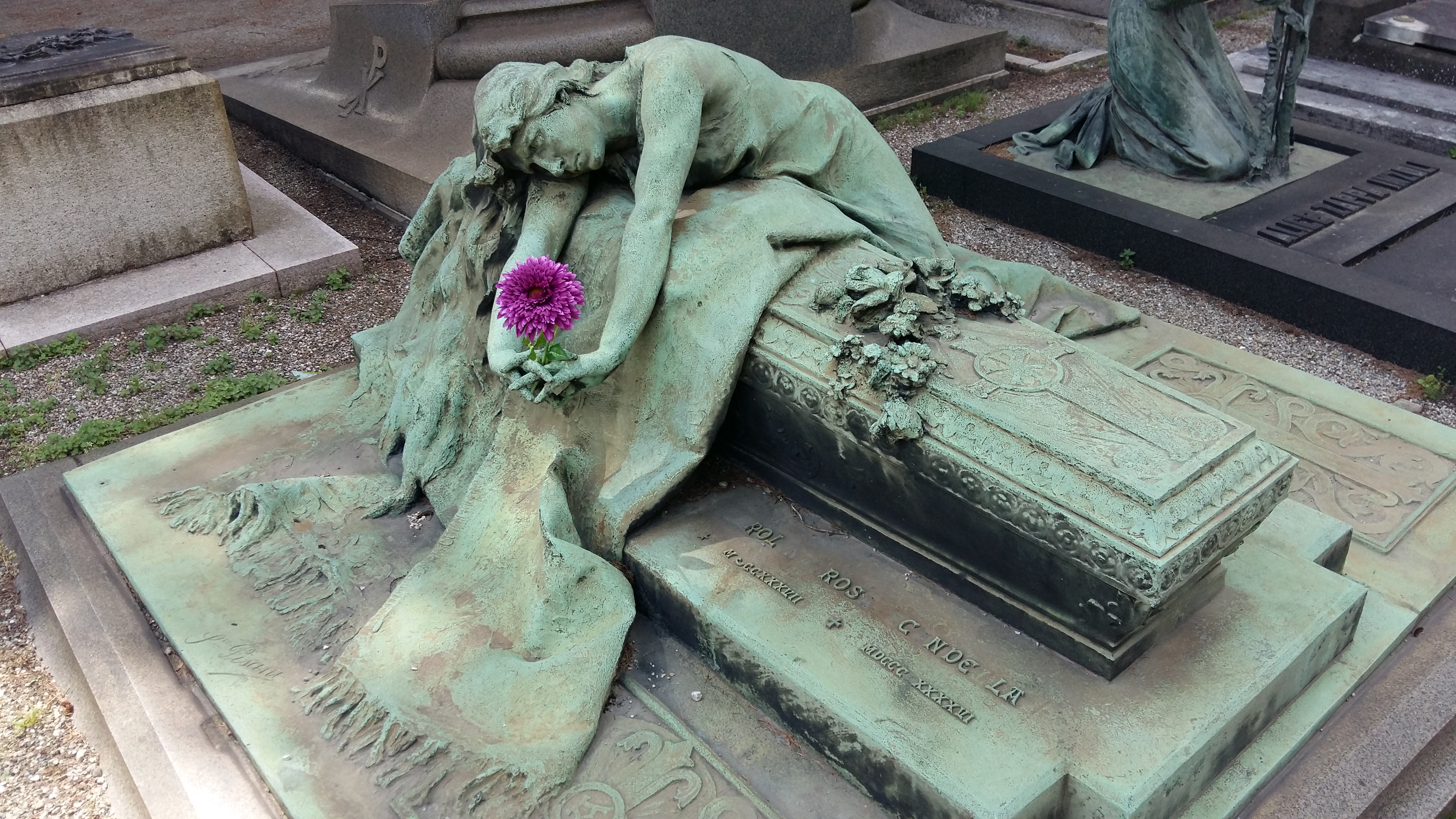
Monument to Carolina Rosa Scandella, Cimitero Monumentale of Milan

He was born to humble parents, his father a tailor. His skills were first identified by a local engineer, Giuseppe Albonico, who through his brother, the parish priestof Tirano, contacted the wealth patron and senator, Luigi Torelli. In 1875, he worked under Giulio Monteverde, and met Giuseppe Vitelleschi in Rome, and the next year, he was soon enrolled in the Brera Academy.

He remained a resident mainly of Milan. He exhibited in 1877 at Naples: Arch of Alfonso d'Aragona; in 1880 at Naples, he exhibited: a stucco statue of Sant' Ambrogio; in 1883 in Milan: The Birichino, bronze head; Wagner, stucco bust; Il dispettoso, Marble statue; and La maliziosetta. In 1883 in Rome, he displayed Lacrime and Il Marinaro. In the 1884 Turin Exhibition, he displayed: Liebig, stucco bust; Wagner; Il Marinaro, and again Il Birichino. In 1886 at Milan, he sent: La Ciociara, statuette in terracotta, and il Mattino; in 1887 at Venice, he sent: La Predica and again Il Marinaro. A Bologna in 1888 exhibited another bronze statuette and a marble head entitled Sorriso. He participated at the first Architecture Exposition of Turin. In 1894 he sculpted the bronze monument dedicated to Giovanni Battista Piatti, found in Largo La Foppa, Milan. The base was designed by the architect Luca Beltrami.

In 1880, he received a large commission from the Società di Solferino e San Martino, an association commemorating the Battle of Solferino and San Martino and the Wars of Italian Independence. For the buildings at the site, he sculpted busts of Napoleone III, Vittorio Emanuele II, and thirteen generals fallen during the wars of independence. In 1883 after studying modelling under Francesco Barzaghi, he was commissioned two reliefs for the funeral chapel of Francesco Hayez in the Monumental Cemetery of Milan. He did participate in making sculptures for the highly decorated Duomo of Milan. In 1886, he formed part of the jury for the exhibition of the “Permanente”, sharing responsibilities with Enrico Butti, Luigi Secchi, Francesco Gonfalonieri, Donato Barcaglia, Enrico Cassi, Riccardo Ripamonti, and Lodovico Pogliaghi.

== Bibliography ==
- Domenico Pisani, “Salvatore Pisani scultore 1859 - 1920”, Pizzo Calabro, Edizioni Esperide, 2012.
