= Henri Maus =

Belgian engineer

Michel Henri Joseph Maus (1808–1893) was a Belgian engineer, the inventor of the first tunnel boring machine.

== Life ==
Maus was born in Namur (then in Sambre-et-Meuse, French First Empire) on 22 October 1808, the grandson of a German who had settled in the city around 1750. His father, Jean-Michel Maus, played a political role in the Belgian Revolution of 1830. After studying at the Athénée de Namur, Henri in 1827 started work for the Société de Luxembourg as a mineralogist. In 1833 he conducted a study for the route of a stretch of a planned Meuse-Moselle canal that was never completed. He went on to work as manager of a coalmine until becoming interested in steam locomotion. From 1835 he worked on Belgian railways, and designed the inclined elevator that enabled trains from Liège to climb 110 metres over a distance of 4.3 kilometres to Ans on the plateau above the city, making rail links from Liège to Brussels and Antwerp practicable. The elevator was taken into use on 1 May 1842, and was internationally regarded as a breakthrough in railway engineering. In 1842 it led to Maus being seconded from the Belgian railways to France, to build a railway elevator in the Loire Valley.

In 1845 Maus was recruited by King Charles Albert of Sardinia to assist in designing a line running from Turin south-eastwards to Genoa on the Mediterranean coast and north-westwards to Chambéry in Savoy. The stretch between Turin and Chambéry required construction of a 12.8-kilometre railway tunnel through the Alps, longer than any existing tunnel, which with the available tunneling techniques would have taken over 30 years to build. In response to this problem, Maus invented a hydraulically powered tunneling machine. The railway between Turin and Genoa was completed in November 1853, but work on the line between Turin and Chambéry was suspended until after the Second Italian War of Independence, when Savoy was ceded to France and the project was resumed under the leadership of Germain Sommeiller. On 17 September 1871 the first train travelled through the Fréjus Rail Tunnel.

Maus had, meanwhile, returned to Belgium in 1854. He declined the position of chief railway engineer to the Grand Duchy of Luxembourg, and in 1857 was reappointed as a full-time functionary of the Belgian state. In 1864 he was seconded to the city of Brussels for preliminary works relating to the covering of the Senne, and also became a member of the Royal Academy of Science, Letters and Fine Arts of Belgium. As a consultant he advised on plans to provide clean water to the city of Brussels, and to build a bridge over the Rhine at Basel (the Wettsteinbrücke). In 1869 he chaired the committee of inquiry into a typhoid epidemic that had hit Brussels.

Maus sat on prize-awarding juries at the 1873 Vienna World's Fair and 1878 Paris World's Fair. In 1877 he was appointed director general of Bridges, Roads and Mines. He died at Ixelles on 11 July 1893. His obituary in the annual of the Royal Academy of Belgium was written by the military engineer Henri Alexis Brialmont.

== Honours and awards ==
- Corresponding member of the Royal Academy of Science, Letters and Fine Arts of Belgium, 16 December 1846; full member, 15 December 1864.
- Chevalier in the Order of Saints Maurice and Lazarus
- Rue Henri Maus, Brussels; Rue Henri Maus, Liège; Technical Institute Henri Maus, Namur.
