= Sebastiano Grandis =

Italian engineer

Sebastiano Grandis (San Dalmazzo of Tenda, 6 April 1817 – Turin, 10 January 1892) was an Italian engineer, famous for having designed and directed with Severino Grattoni and Germain Sommeiller the works for the construction of Frejus railway tunnel (also known as Traforo del Cenisio or Mont Cenis Tunnel) 13.7 km (8.5 mi) in length between France and Italy, the first large tunnel in a mountain. For this project, along with Sommeiller, they pioneered the use of a large pneumatic jackhammer.

== Biography ==
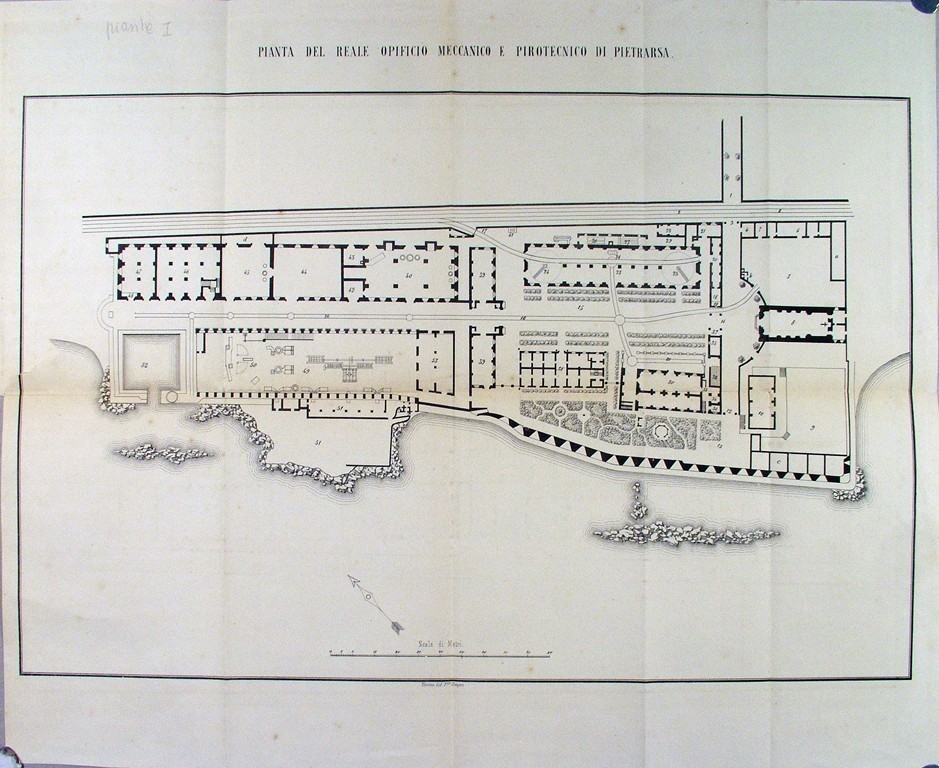
Royal Mechanical and Pyrotechnic Works of Pietrarsa, planimetry. From Relazione del Signor Cavaliere Sebastiano Grandis ispettore delle strade ferrate dello Stato, 1861.

Grandis was born in the county of Nice, at that time part of the Kingdom of Sardinia, from parents originally from Borgo San Dalmazzo (CN). His grandfather, concessionaire of the Vallauria mine, guaranteed an excellent standard of living for the entire family. When Sebastiano was still a child, his father Valentino left the mine and opened a drapery factory in Borgo San Dalmazzo, where he moved with his family. After studying at the Royal College of Ventimiglia and finishing high school in Cuneo, in 1837 Sebastiano moved to Turin to attend university. He graduated in 1841 in hydraulic engineering and, in 1842, in civil architecture. From 1841 he began teaching at the university.

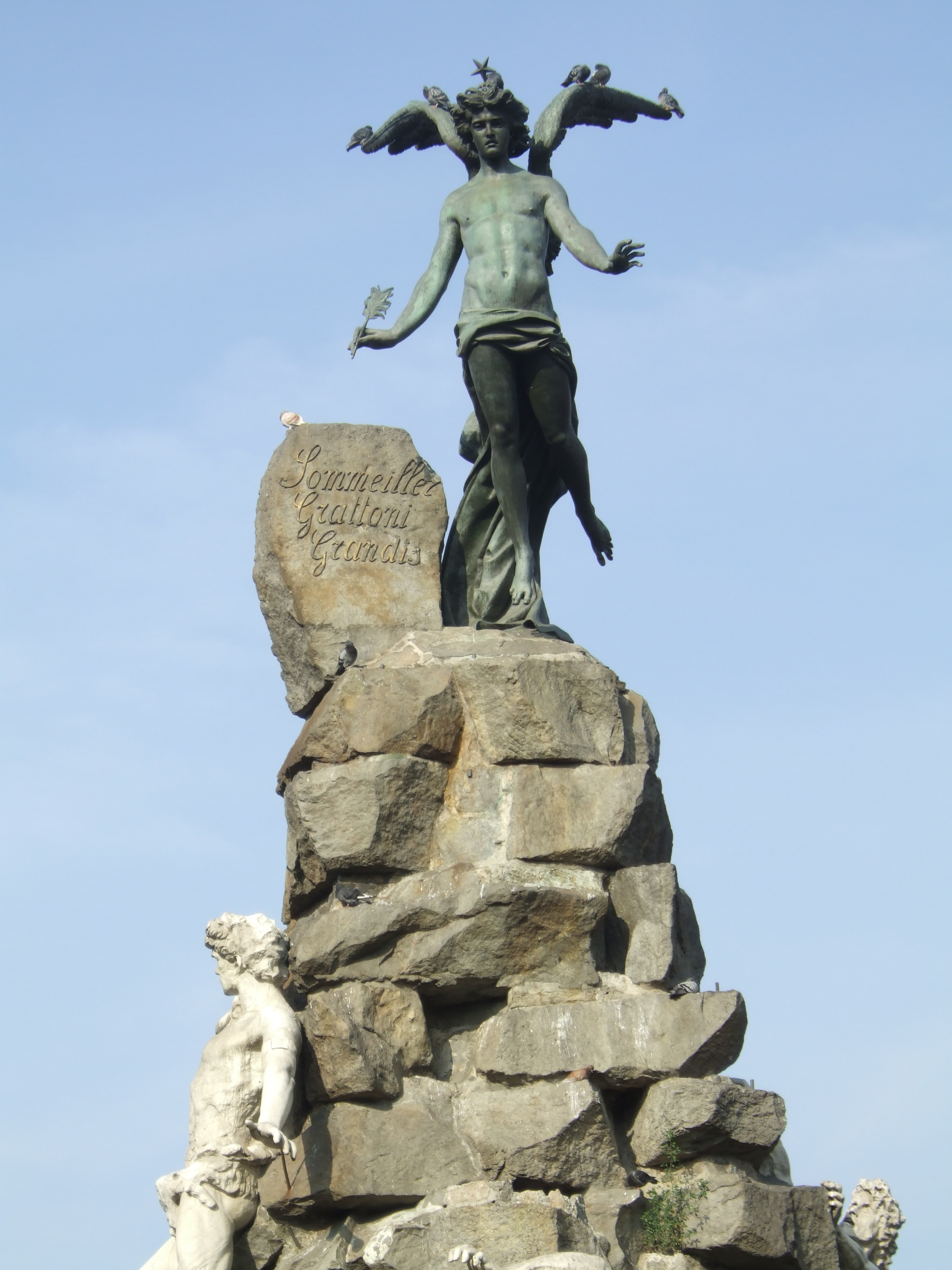
Monument to the builders of the Frejus railway tunnel in piazza Statuto in Turin. Detail: the Scientific Genius engraves the names of the three engineers: Sommeiller, Grattoni and Grandis.

In 1843 he entered the Civil Engineers Department. In 1846 he was sent together with Germain Sommeiller, already his fellow student, to Belgium in order to learn the techniques of construction and management of railways. In 1848 he was promoted to 2nd class engineer and he was entrusted with the direction of the Turin-Moncalieri railway line. In 1851 he was promoted to 1st class engineer. In 1852 he was sent to Austria and Germany, as an observer, and in 1854 he became director of the railway workshops of the Kingdom of Sardinia. In 1859 he was in charge of managing the movement of Piedmontese troops by rail during the Second War of Independence. He then spent a month at the telegraph station of Casale to supervise the transport of Franco-Sardinian troops and their weapons and provisions, which were concentrating between Alessandria, Casale and Valenza.

In 1867 he became a member of the Superior Council of Public Works, but the work that made him famous was the construction of the Frejus Tunnel with Germain Sommeiller and Severino Grattoni and the patenting of the pneumatic drill, which was used to excavate the tunnel itself. In addition to these works, there are also some of his written memoirs, including Sullo stabilimento metallurgico e meccanico di Pietrarsa presso Napoli (published in 1861) and Considerazioni tecniche ed economiche sul traforo delle Alpi (published posthumously in 1893).

Upon his death, he left his possessions to the town of Borgo San Dalmazzo, to finance scholarships for deserving young people.

In 1869 he married Antonietta Imberti, from whom he had no children. The brothers had numerous descendants who still live in the house in Borgo San Dalmazzo.

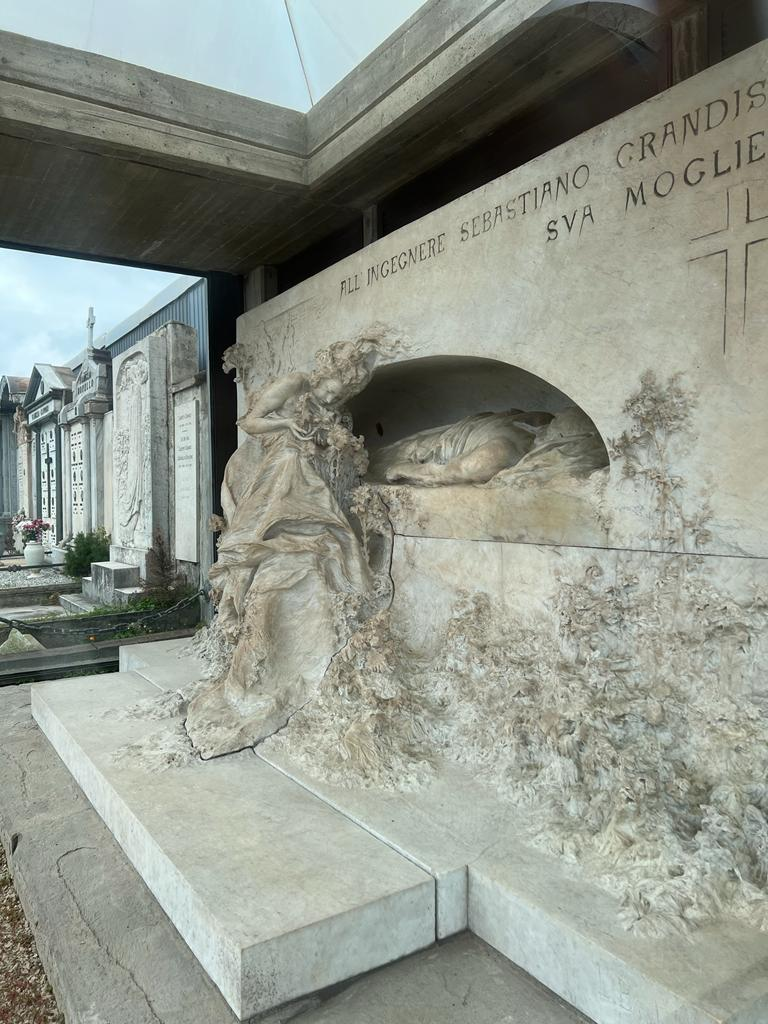
Funerary monument commissioned by his wife and made by the artist Leonardo Bistolfi. Borgo San Dalmazzo, cemetery. Detail: on the upper right corner the words "TO THE ENGINEER SEBASTIANO GRANDIS - HIS WIFE".

== Toponymy and monuments ==
- Bardonecchia: the municipality has dedicated to Sebastiano Grandis a street
- Turin: the city has dedicated to all those who worked on the Frejus tunnel a memorial monument in the center of piazza Statuto, inaugurated in 1890 and at the top of which are displayed the surnames of the three engineers, including the one of Grandis. Moreover a street in the area near piazza Statuto has been dedicated to him
- Rome: the capital city has dedicated a side street of Via di Santa Croce in Gerusalemme to Sebastiano Grandis. Curiously, the next two side streets are dedicated to Germain Sommeiller and Severino Grattoni
- Cuneo: in Cuneo there is a street and a school named after Sebastiano Grandis
- Borgo San Dalmazzo: Borgo San Dalmazzo has dedicated to Sebastiano Grandis a street, a square and the headquarter of the school; in the cemetery there is a funerary monument commissioned by his wife and made by the artist Leonardo Bistolfi
- Genoa: in the Sampierdarena district there is a Vico Grandis between Via Luigi Dottesio and Vico Grattoni.

== Honors ==
=== Italian honors ===

Grand Officer of the Order of the Crown of Italy

Commander of the Order of Saints Maurice and Lazarus

=== Foreign honors ===

Grand Officer of the Order of the Legion of Honor (France)

Knight of II class of the Order of Vasa (Sweden)
