= Energy in Italy =

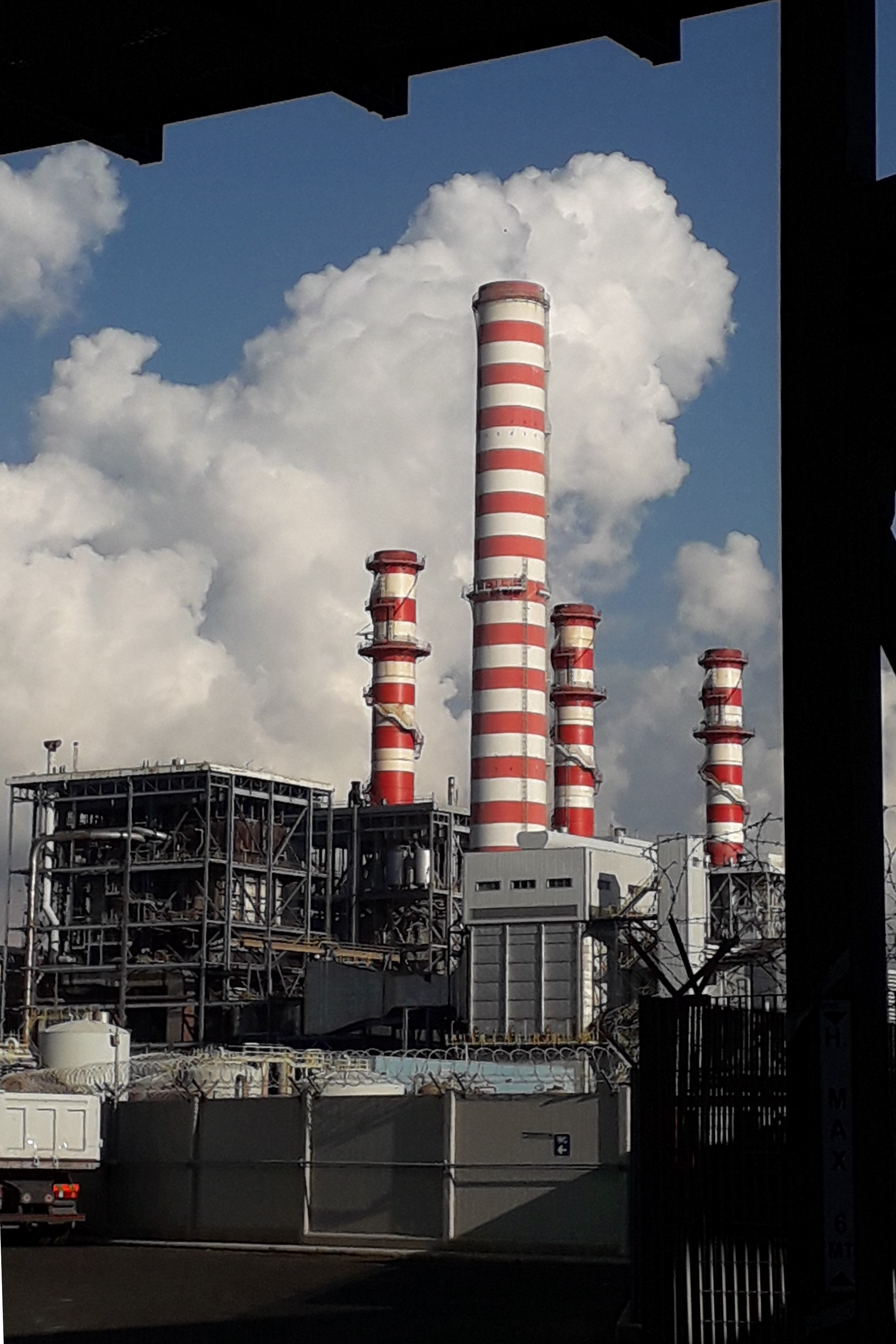
Thermoelectric plant in Civitavecchia, Lazio

Energy in Italy comes mostly from fossil fuels. Among the most used resources are petroleum (mostly used for the transport sector), natural gas (used for electric energy production and heating), coal and renewables. Italy has few energy resources, and most supplies are imported.

An important share of its electricity is imported, mainly from Switzerland and France. The share of primary energy dedicated to electricity production is above 35%, and has grown steadily since the 1970s.

Electricity is produced mainly from natural gas, which accounts for the source of more than half of the total final electric energy produced. Another important source is hydroelectric power, which was practically the only source of electricity until 1960. Wind and solar power grew rapidly between 2010 and 2013 thanks to high incentives. Italy is one of the world's largest producers of renewable energy.

== Overview ==
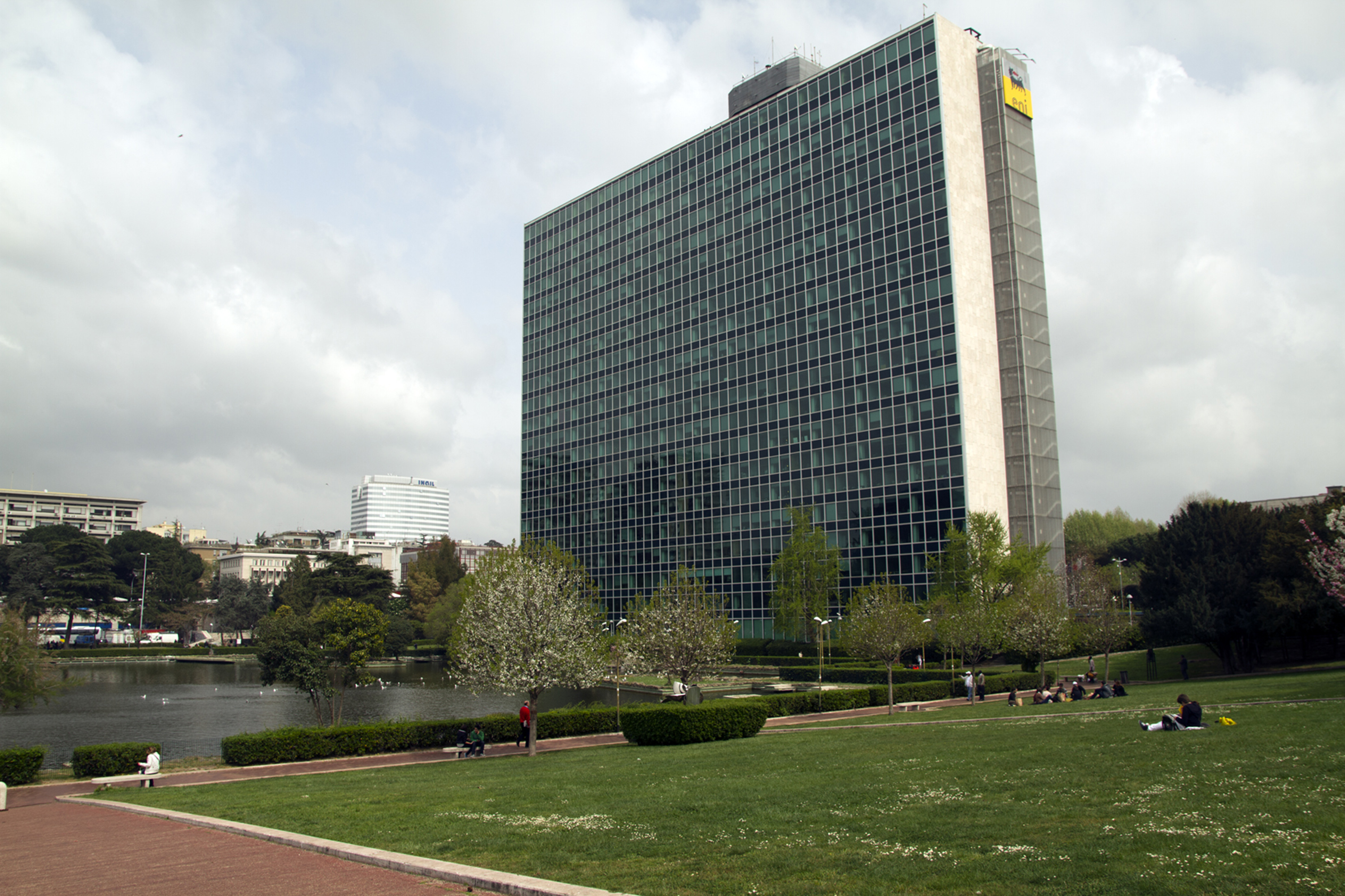
Eni is considered one of the world's oil and gas "Supermajors".

Energy in Italy come mostly from fossil fuels. Among the most used resources are petroleum (mostly used for the transport sector), natural gas (used for electric energy production and heating), coal and renewables. Electricity is produced mainly from natural gas, which accounts for the source of more than half of the total final electric energy produced. Another important source is hydroelectric power, which was practically the only source of electricity until 1960. The first power plant in continental Europe was inaugurated in Milan in 1883.

Eni, with operations in 79 countries, is considered one of the seven "Supermajor" oil companies in the world, and one of the world's largest industrial companies. The Val d'Agri area, Basilicata, hosts the largest onshore hydrocarbon field in Europe. Moderate natural gas reserves, mainly in the Po Valley and offshore Adriatic Sea, have been discovered in recent years and constitute an important mineral resource.

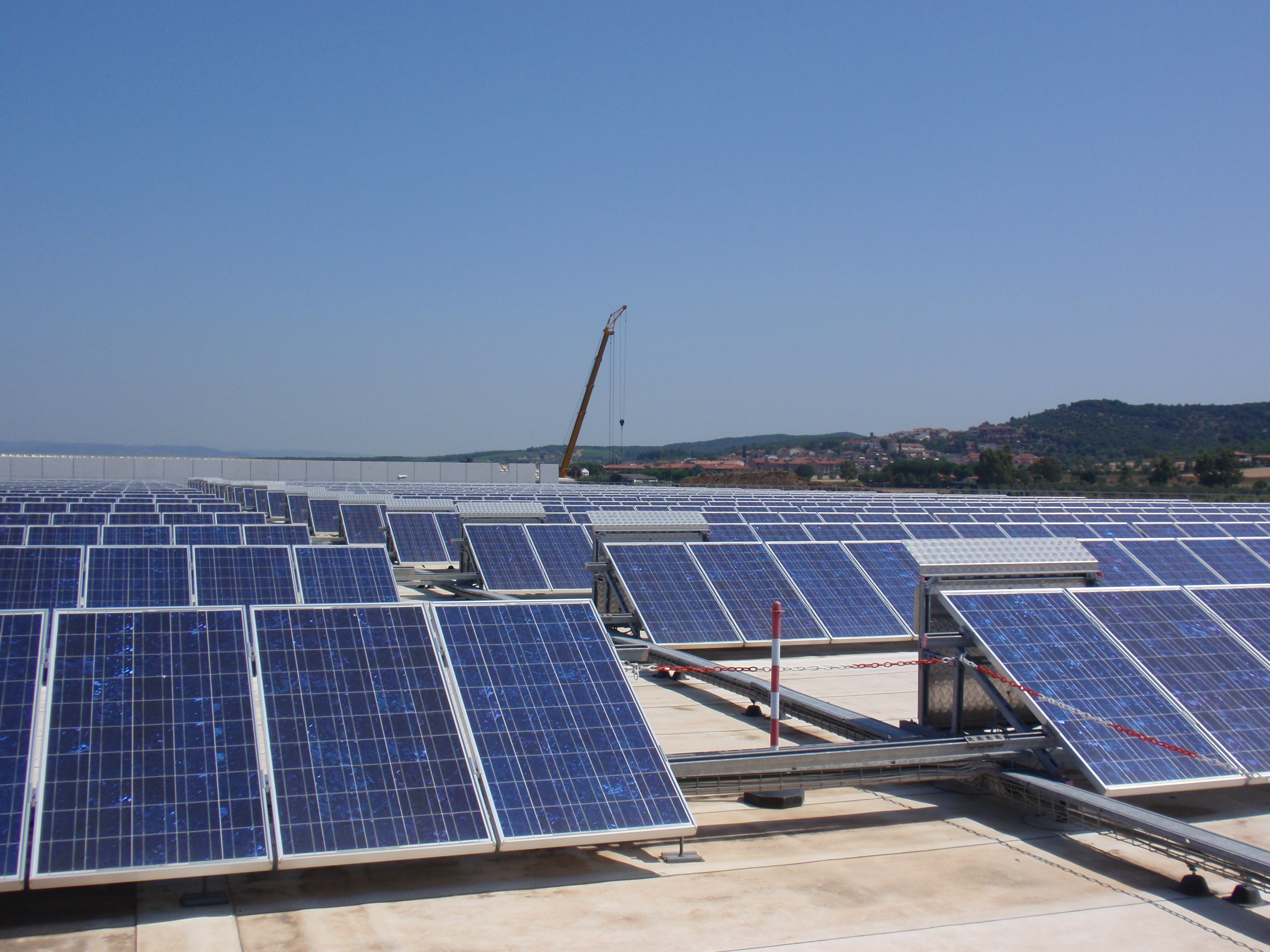
Solar panels in Piombino, Tuscany. Italy is one of the world's largest producers of renewable energy.

In the last decade, Italy has become one of the world's largest producers of renewable energy, ranking as the second largest producer in the European Union and the ninth in the world. Wind power, hydroelectricity, and geothermal power are also important sources of electricity in the country. Italy was the first country in the world to exploit geothermal energy to produce electricity. The first Italian geothermal power plant was built in Tuscany, which is where all currently active geothermal plants in Italy are located. In 2014 the geothermal production was 5.92 TWh.

Solar energy production alone accounted for almost 9% of the total electric production in the country in 2014, making Italy the country with the highest contribution from solar energy in the world. The Montalto di Castro Photovoltaic Power Station, completed in 2010, is the largest photovoltaic power station in Italy with 85 MW. Other examples of large PV plants in Italy are San Bellino (70.6 MW), Cellino san Marco (42.7 MW) and Sant’ Alberto (34.6 MW).

Renewable sources account for the 27.5% of all electricity produced in Italy, with hydro alone reaching 12.6%, followed by solar at 5.7%, wind at 4.1%, bioenergy at 3.5%, and geothermal at 1.6%. The rest of the national demand is covered by fossil fuels (38.2% natural gas, 13% coal, 8.4% oil) and by imports.

Italy has managed four nuclear reactors until the 1980s, but in 1987, after the Chernobyl disaster, a large majority of Italians passed a referendum opting for phasing out nuclear power in Italy. The government responded by closing existing nuclear power plants and stopping work on projects underway, continuing to work to the nuclear energy program abroad instead. The national power company Enel operates seven nuclear reactors in Spain (through Endesa) and four in Slovakia (through Slovenské elektrárne), and in 2005 made an agreement with Électricité de France for a nuclear reactor in France. With these agreements, Italy has managed to access nuclear power and direct involvement in design, construction, and operation of the plants without placing reactors on Italian territory.

== General statistics ==
Energy in Italy
	Population	Primary energy consumption	Production	Import	Electricity consumption	CO_{2}-emission
Year	Million	PJ	PJ	PJ	TWh	Mt
1990	56.7	6,136	1,060	5,329	235	389
2000	56.9	7,182	1,180	6,382	302	420
2010	59.8	7,274	1,382	6,217	326	392
2011	60.1	7,033	1,337	5,916	327	384
2012	60.3	6,755	1,464	5,528	321	367
2013	60.6	6,506	1,539	5,159	311	338
2014	60.8	6,145	1,536	4,817	304	319
2015	60.7	6,388	1,511	5,084	310	330
2016	60.6	6,321	1,403	5,088	308	326
2017	60.5	6,424	1,424	5,215	315	322
2018	60.5	6,304	1,455	5,105	316	317
2019	60.3	6,237	1,441	5,128	314	309
Variation; 1990-2019	+6%	+2%	+36%	-4%	+34%	-21%

== International comparisons ==
In the rankings published by the International Energy Agency, Italy appears among the top ten countries in the world for several of the indicators:

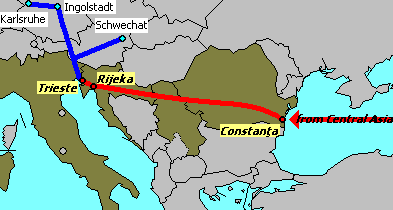
The Pan-European Pipeline (red) and its connection to the Transalpine Pipeline (blue)

Italy's position in the world rankings
Energy source	Indicator	Rank	Year	Quantity	Unity	% world
Crude oil	Net import	8th	2019	65	Mt	3.1%
Natural gas	Net import	4th	2020	66	Mds m^{3}	6.8%
Electricity	Net import	2nd	2019	38	TWh	11.4%
Electricity production by sources	Natural gas	10th	2019	142	TWh	2.2%
Wind power	Electrical production	14th	2020	18.7	TWh	1.2%
Wind power	Power installed	10th	2019	10.7	GW	1.7%
Photovoltaic solar energy	Electrical production	6th	2019	24	TWh	3.5%
Photovoltaic solar energy	Power installed	6th	2019	20.9	GW	3.5%
Photovoltaic solar energy	% PV/elec.	1st	2019	8.1	%	
Biomass	Electrical production	8th	2019	17.2	TWh	3.2%
Geothermal	Electrical production	6th	2019	6.07	TWh	6.7%

== Energy resources ==
=== Reserves ===
Italy's fossil fuel reserves are modest, but its renewable energy potential is significant, especially for hydro and solar.

- Proven and economically recoverable oil reserves are estimated at the end of 2017 at 78 Mt, and additional potential resources at 1,540 Mt; cumulative production up to 2017 reached 205 Mt: Italy has therefore already largely depleted its resources; at the rate of current production (4.1 Mt in 2017), the reserves would be exhausted in 19 years;
- Proven and economically recoverable gas reserves are estimated at the end of 2017 at 38 billion m^{3}, and additional potential resources at 405 billion m^{3}; cumulative production up to 2017 reached 766 billion m^{3}: Italy has therefore also largely depleted its resources there; at the rate of current production (5.4 billion m^{3} in 2017), proven reserves would be exhausted in 7 years;
- For coal, Italy has only 10 Mt of reserves.

Italy benefits from significant hydroelectric potential, particularly in the Alps, but it is already almost fully exploited; During the first half of the 20th century, hydroelectricity covered almost all of the country's electricity needs.

The map of solar radiation in Italy reveals high potentials in southern Italy, particularly in Sicily and Sardinia.

=== National energy production ===
In 2018, the country's energy production reached 43.42 Mtoe, up 10.9% compared to 2017, broken down into:

- fossil fuels: 21.6%, of which:
  - natural gas: 4.46 Mtoe (10.3%), covering 7.5% of domestic gas consumption;
  - oil: 4.68 Mtoe (10.8%), 8% of oil consumption;
  - coal: 0.25 Mtoe (0.6%), 2.7% of coal consumption;
- renewable energies: 34.02 Mtoe, i.e. 78.4%.

All of these resources covered only 25.2% of the country's needs.

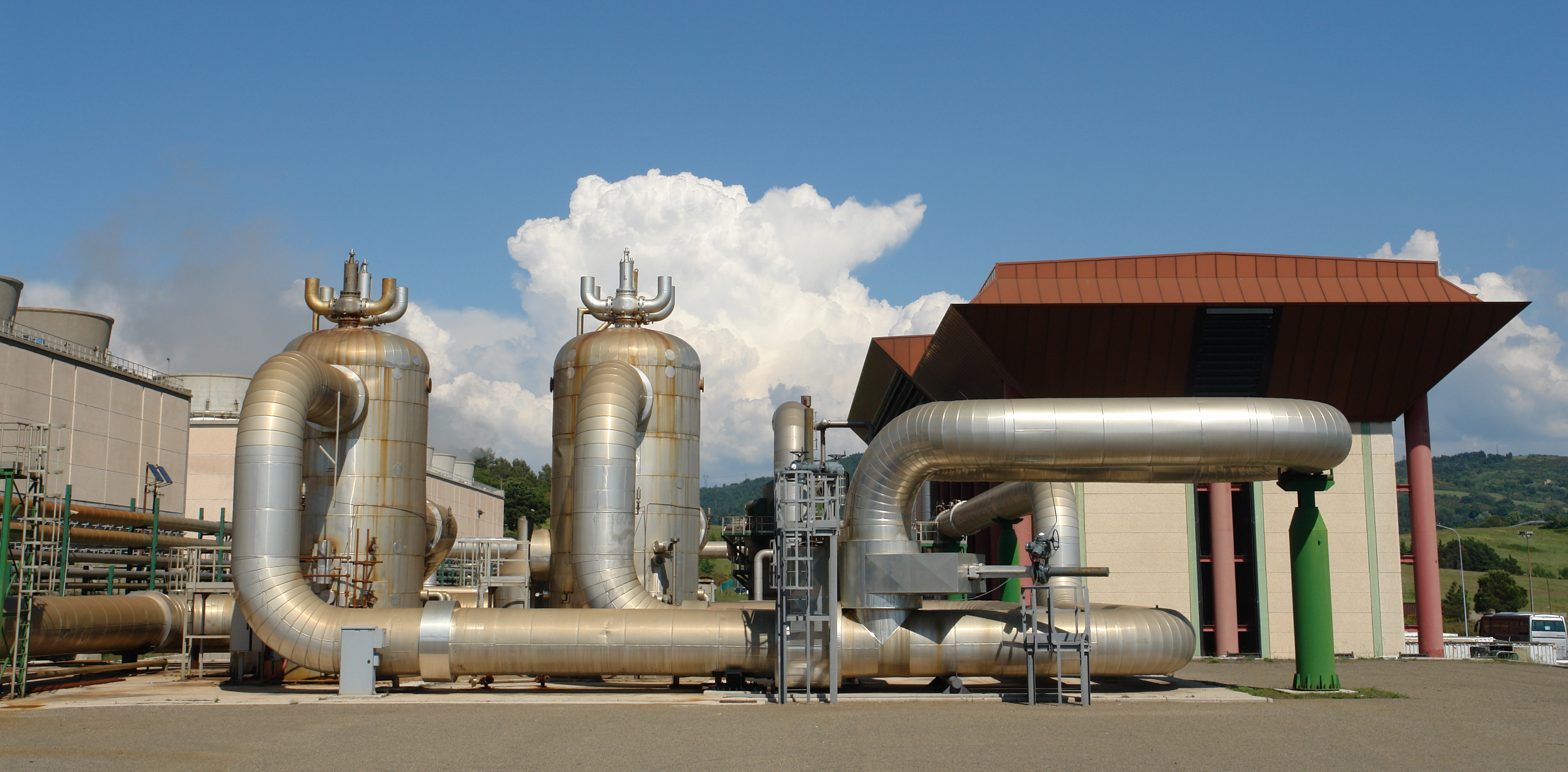
Geothermal power plant in Larderello, Tuscany

Primary energy production in Italy by source (PJ)
Source	1990	%	2000	%	2010	%	2015	2020	% 2020	var. 2020/1990
Coal	12	1.1	0,1	0.01	2,7	0.2	2,2	0	0 %	-100 %
Oil	187	17.6	196	16.7	235	17.0	242	241	16.4 %	+29 %
Natural gas	587	55.4	570	48.4	288	20.9	232	146	9.9 %	-75 %
Total fossil fuels	786	74.1	767	65.0	526	38.1	477	387	26.3 %	-51 %
Hydraulic	114	10.7	159	13.5	184	13.3	164	168	11.4 %	+48 %
Geoth., solar, wind	125	11.8	181	15.3	245	17.8	373	391	26.6 %	+214 %
Biomass-waste	36	3.4	73	6.2	426	30.9	498	526	35.7 %	+1381 %
Total renewable energy	274	25.9	413	35.0	856	61.9	1,035	1,086	73.7 %	+296 %
Total	1,060	100	1,180	100	1,382	100	1,511	1,473	100 %	+39 %
Source of data: International Energy Agency

=== Imported energy ===
Italy depends on its imports for a very high share of its energy needs: in 2018, its energy imports reached 158.51 Mtoe against 163.46 Mtoe in 2017; after deducting 31.09 Mtoe of exports (mainly petroleum products), net imports represented 74.0% of the country's total energy consumption, while its national production only covered 25.2% of his needs.

Oil is the main imported energy: in 2018, net imports of oil and oil products reached 51.97 Mt, i.e. 88.7% of the country's domestic oil consumption. The 11 refineries in operation in 2018 have a refining capacity of 83.7 Mt/year, down 2.7% compared to 2017. The Venice biorefinery, the world's first refinery converted to vegetable sources in 2014, has a biodiesel production capacity of 360,000 tonnes /year from used cooking oils and palm oil; this capacity will be increased to 420,000 tonnes/year in 2021, to which will be added the Gela biorefinery (600,000 tonnes/year).

Natural gas is the second most imported energy: in 2018, net imports of natural gas reached 53.27 Mtoe, or 92.9% of the country's gas consumption.

Italy also imported 9.23 Mtoe of coal in 2018, mainly for power plants, coke and heat production plants.

Even electricity is largely imported: 9.66 Mtoe in 2018, or 13% of total gross electricity supply.

=== Infrastructure ===
==== Refineries ====
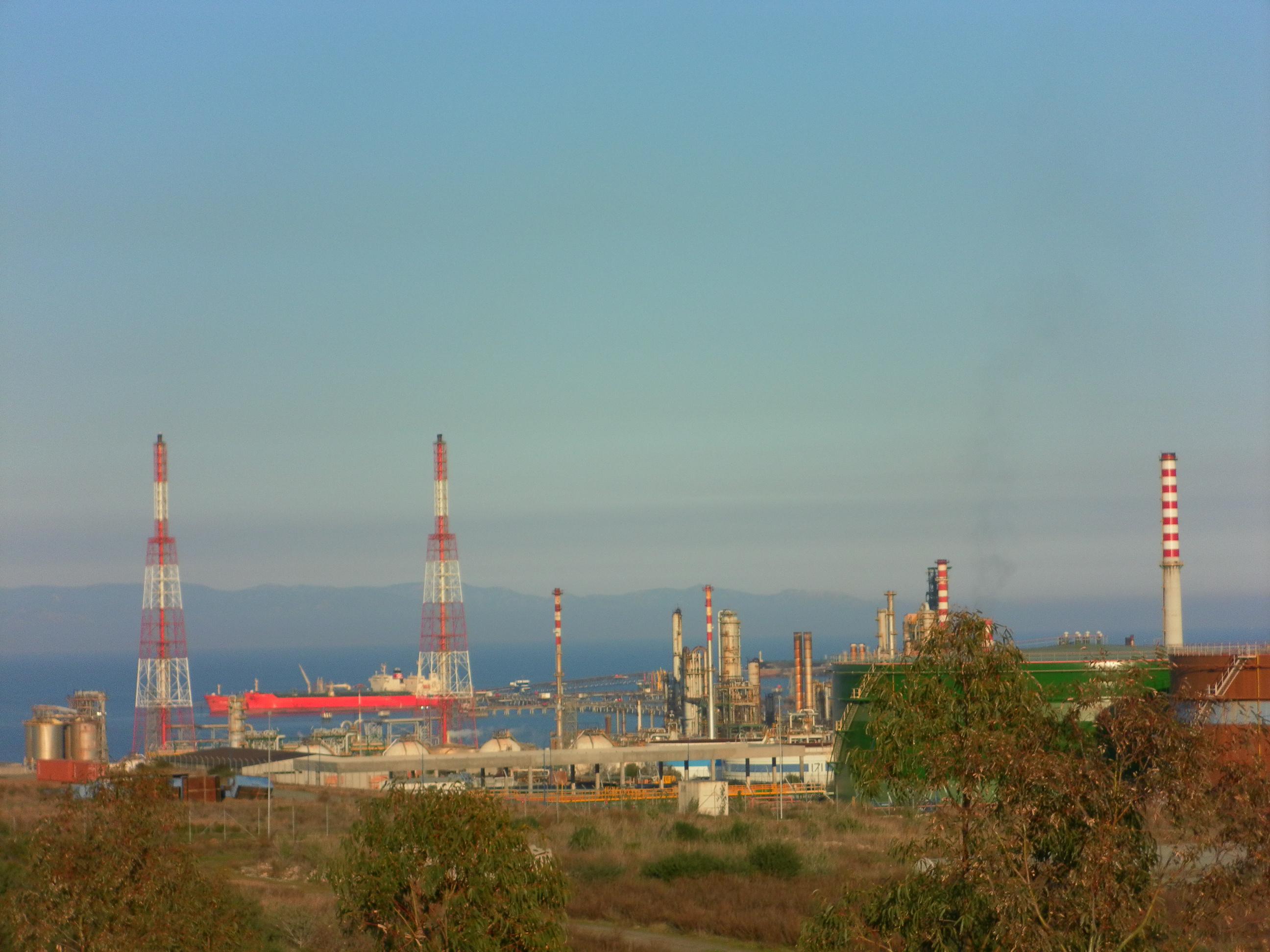
Refinery in Sarroch, Sardinia

The Priolo Gargallo complex, in Sicily, includes 2 refineries linked by pipelines: ISAB NORD and ISAB SUD, belonging to the Russian company Lukoil, with a total capacity of 16 Mt/year.

The Sarroch refinery in Sardinia (capacity: 15 Mt/year), i.e. more than 20% of the country's refining capacity, belongs to SARAS (Società Anonima Raffinerie Sarde).

In May 2018, the Algerian company Sonatrach bought from Esso (a 100% subsidiary of ExxonMobil) the Augusta refinery in Sicily (capacity: 9.5 Mt/year), three oil terminals located in Augusta, Naples and Palermo and their associated pipeline systems.

The refineries of Porto Marghera, in Veneto, and Gela, in Sicily, have been converted into bio-refineries using as raw materials vegetable oils, waste (frying oil, fats, urban waste), algae, etc. ( 230,000 tonnes/year since 2014 in Porto Marghera, 750,000 tonnes/year since 2019 in Gela).

==== Gas pipelines ====
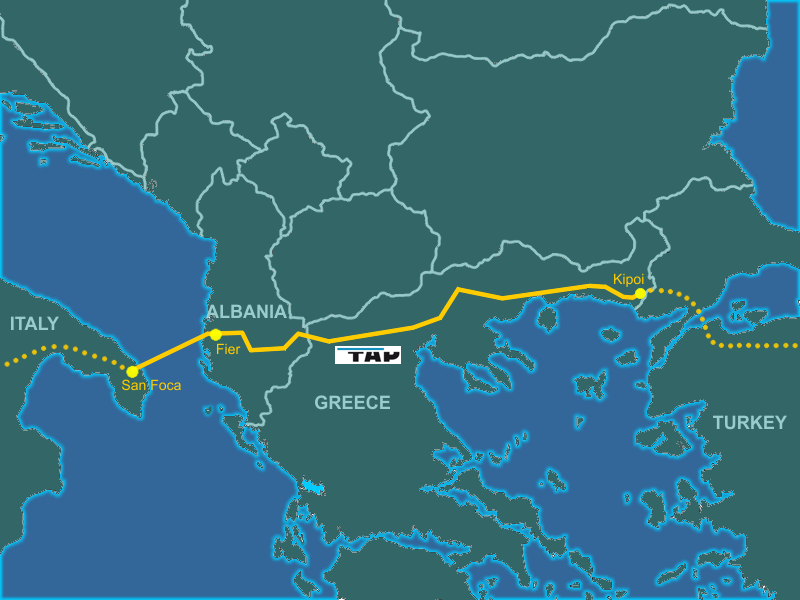
Trans Adriatic Pipeline

Russian gas is transported to Italy via the Yamal–Europe pipeline, then the Trans Austria Gas Pipeline.

The Trans-Mediterranean Pipeline (or Enrico Mattei gas pipeline) transports gas from Algeria. Starting from Hassi R'Mel, it covers 550 km in Algerian territory, then 370 km in Tunisia, crosses the Mediterranean Sea by an underwater section of 155 km, then Sicily (340 km), the Strait of Messina, before going up the entire Italian Peninsula, to join the gas network near Bologna.

The Greenstream pipeline, commissioned in 2004, the longest underwater gas pipeline in the Mediterranean Sea, connects western Libya to Sicily.

The Transitgas Pipeline, inaugurated in 2008, connects the gas market in northwestern Europe with Italy.

The Trans Adriatic Pipeline project is a gas pipeline project transporting natural gas from the Caspian Sea (Azerbaijan) to the European market. It leaves from the Greek-Turkish border and crosses Greece, Albania and the Adriatic Sea to arrive in Italy. Its construction was completed in October 2020 and its operation should begin in mid-November.

== Energy consumption ==
Energy consumption by source, Italy

=== From primary energy consumed to final energy consumed ===
Energy balance 2019
Resources	PJ	%	Use	PJ	%
Primary energy production	1,441	23.1 %	Energy branch consumption and losses	1,248	20.0 %
Imports	6,360	102.0 %	Final non-energy consumption	293	4.7 %
Exports	-1,231	-19.7 %	Final energy consumption	4,635	74.3 %
Holds	-277	-4.4 %	Statistical discrepancies	61	1.0 %
Inventory change	-55	-0.9 %			
Total resources	6,237	100 %	Total uses	6,237	100 %
Energy branch consumption detail			Breakdown of final energy consumption		
Translation losses	845	68 %	Industry	1,048	22.6 %
Own consumption	322	26 %	Transportation	1,501	32.4 %
Transmission/distribution losses	81	6 %	Residential	1,300	28.0 %
			Tertiary	661	14.3 %
			Agriculture + fishing	123	2.7 %

=== Primary energy consumption ===
In 2024, Italy's gross domestic energy consumption was 139.8 Mtoe. Petroleum products accounted for 51.6 Mtoe and natural gas for 50.6 Mtoe, together representing about 73% of total consumption. Renewable sources accounted for 29.8 Mtoe, or about 21%, while solid fuels had fallen to 2.3 Mtoe.

Electrical renewable energies cover 34.5% of gross domestic electricity consumption; thermal renewable energies provide 10.9 Mtoe, including 7.9 Mtoe from biomass and 2.6 Mtoe from heat pumps; biofuels provide 1.25 Mtoe (biodiesel).

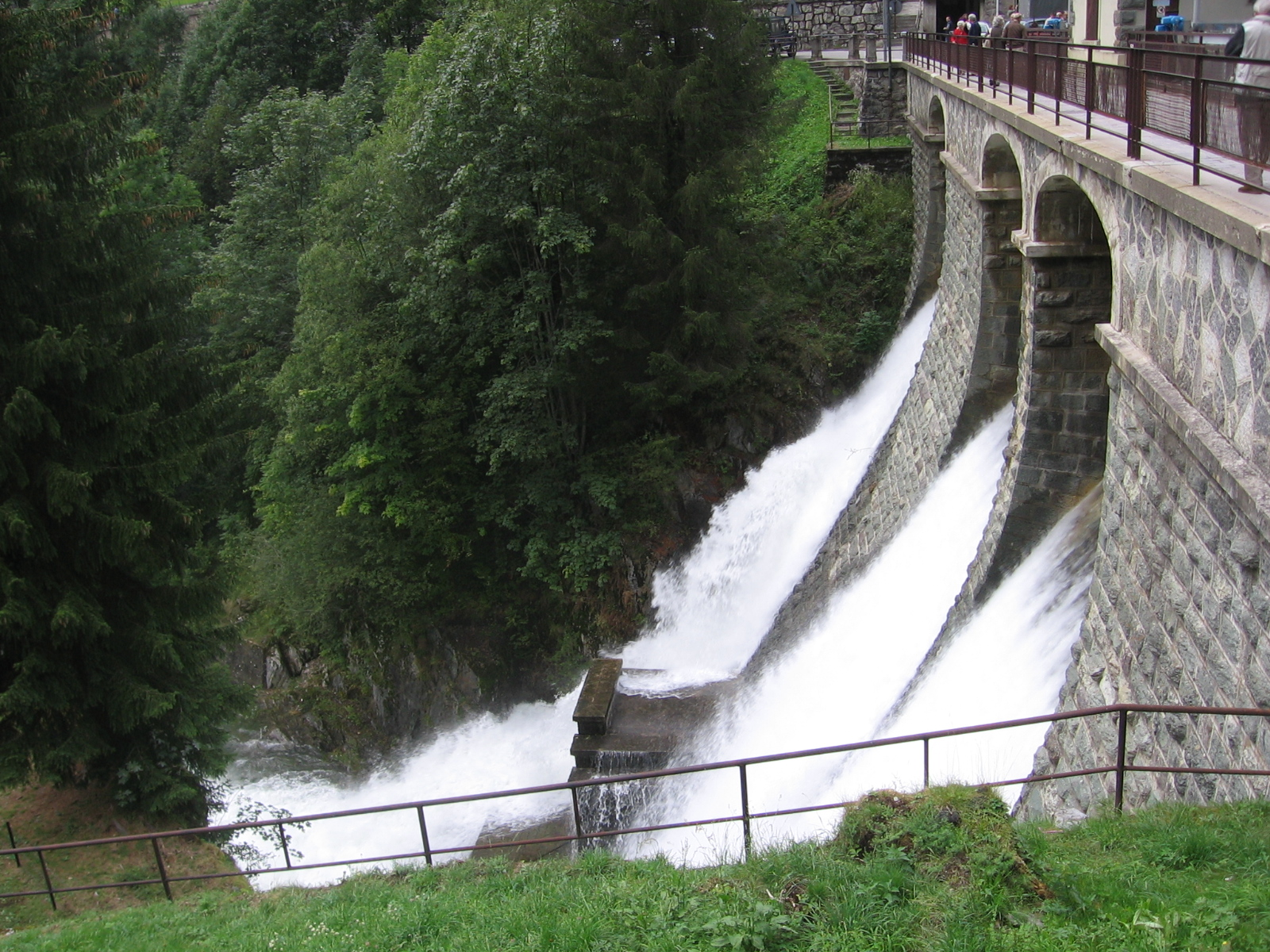
Hydroelectric power plant in Carona, Lombardy

Primary energy consumption in Italy by source (PJ)
Source	1990	%	2000	%	2010	%	2015	2020	% 2020	var. 2020/1990
Coal	613	10.0	526	7.3	572	7.9	515	199	3.4 %	-68 %
Oil	3,488	56.8	3,636	50.6	2,734	37.6	2,242	1,842	31.9 %	-47 %
Natural gas	1,633	26.6	2,426	33.8	2,849	39.2	2,315	2,448	42.4 %	+50 %
Total fossil fuels	5,734	93.4	6,588	91.7	6,155	84.6	5,072	4,490	77.7 %	-22 %
Hydraulic	114	1.9	159	2.2	184	2.5	164	168	2.9 %	+48 %
Geoth., solar, wind	125	2.0	181	2.5	245	3.4	373	391	6.8 %	+214 %
Biomass-waste	39	0.6	94	1.3	530	7.3	611	612	10.6 %	+1,453 %
Total renewable energy	278	4.5	434	6.0	959	13.2	1,148	1,171	20.3 %	+321 %
Electricity tax balance	125	2.0	160	2.2	159	2.2	167	116	2.0 %	-7 %
Total	6,136	100	7,182	100	7,274	100	6,388	5,777	100 %	-6 %
Source of data: International Energy Agency

=== Final energy consumption ===
==== Breakdown by source ====
Final energy consumption (after refining, transformation into electricity or district heating, transport, etc.) was 127.3 Mtoe in 2018, up 1.5% compared to 2017. It was divided into 73, 2% fossil fuels (1.7% coal, 41.8% oil, 29.7% natural gas), 7.0% thermal renewable energies and 19.8% electricity. The production of electricity was split into 60.3% from fossil fuels and 39.7% from renewables; in total, final consumption was therefore 85% fossil fuel and 15% renewable.

Final energy consumption changed as follows:

Final energy consumption in Italy by source (PJ)
Source	1990	%	2000	%	2010	%	2015	2019	% 2019	var. 2019/1990
Coal	149	3.1	112	2.1	79	1.4	40	34	0.7 %	-78 %
Oil products	2,573	53.5	2,608	48.4	2,279	40.7	1,974	1,896	38.5 %	-26 %
Natural gas	1,273	26.4	1,616	30.0	1,636	29.2	1,405	1,410	28.6 %	+11 %
Total fossil fuels	3,995	83.0	4,336	80.4	3,994	71.3	3,419	3,340	67.8 %	-16 %
Solar thermal	9	0.2	9	0.2	11	0.2	13	15	0.3 %	+75 %
Biomass-waste	36	0.8	66	1.2	378	6.7	349	349	7.1 %	+866 %
Electricity	773	16.1	983	18.2	1,078	19.2	1,035	1,051	21.3 %	+36 %
District heating	0		0		140	2.5	161	174	3.5 %	ns
Total	4,813	100	5,394	100	5,600	100	4,976	4,929	100 %	+2 %
Source of data : International Energy Agency

The share of renewable energies evolved as follows:

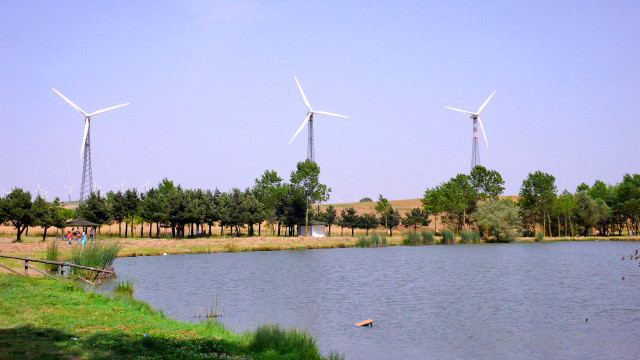
Wind power plant in San Giorgio La Molara, Campania

Gross final consumption of renewable energy in Italy (Mtep)
Sector	2010	2015	2016	2017	variation % 2017/2010
Electrical sector	5.92	9.43	9.50	9.73	+64 %
Hydraulic (corrected)*	3.73	3.95	3.97	3.96	+6 %
Wind (corrected)*	0.76	1.32	1.42	1.48	+95 %
Solar	0.16	1.97	1.90	2.10	+1,212 %
Geothermal	0.46	0.53	0.54	0.53	+15 %
Bioenergy**	0.81	1.67	1.67	1.66	+105 %
Thermal sector	10.02	10.69	10.54	11.21	+12 %
Geothermal	0.14	0.13	0.14	0.15	+7 %
Solar thermal	0.13	0.19	0.20	0.21	+62 %
Bioenergy**	7.65	7.78	7.59	8.20	+7 %
Heat pumps***	2.09	2.58	2.61	2.65	+27 %
Transport sector	1.42	1.16	1.04	1.06	-25 %
Total renewable energies	17.36	21.29	21.08	22.00	+27 %
Share of gross final consumption	13.0 %	17.5 %	17.4 %	18.3 %	
* production corrected for the effects of variations in precipitation (hydro) and wind (wind), according to the rules of Directive 2009/28/EC. **including renewable share of urban waste. *** renewable share

==== Breakdown by sector ====
The breakdown of final energy consumption by use was as follows:

- non-energy uses: 5.7 Mtep (4.5%; mainly chemicals);
- bunkers: 3.15 Mtoe (2.5%; aircraft consumption excluding domestic flights and international ferry lines);
- domestic energy use: 118.5 Mtoe (93.1%), of which:
  - industry: 27.2 Mtoe (21.4%);
  - transport: 40.1 Mtoe (31.5%);
  - residential-tertiary: 48.1 Mtoe (37.8%);
  - agriculture: 3.0 Mtoe (2.4%).

Note: the International Energy Agency does not take into account international bunkers, which are not domestic consumption.

The breakdown by sector of final energy consumption changed as follows:

Final energy consumption in Italy by sector (PJ)
Sector	1990	%	2000	%	2010	%	2015	2019	% 2019	var. 2019/1990
Industry	1,427	29.7	1,602	29.7	1,262	22.5	1,046	1,048	21.3 %	-27 %
Transportation	1,369	28.5	1,662	30.8	1,615	28.8	1,523	1,501	30.5 %	+10 %
Residential	1,091	22.7	1,155	21.4	1,482	26.5	1,360	1,300	26.4 %	+19 %
Tertiary	342	7.1	483	9.0	711	12.7	644	661	13.4 %	+93 %
Agriculture	122	2.5	122	2.3	114	2.0	112	114	2.3 %	-6 %
Fishing	8	0.2	11	0.2	9	0.2	8	9	0.2 %	+5 %
Unspecified	16	0.3	7	0.1	7	0.1	6	3	0.1 %	-81 %
Non-energy uses (chemistry)	436	9.1	353	6.5	400	7.1	277	293	5.9 %	-33 %
Total	4,813	100	5,394	100	5,600	100	4,976	4,929	100 %	+2 %
Source of data : International Energy Agency

== Electricity ==
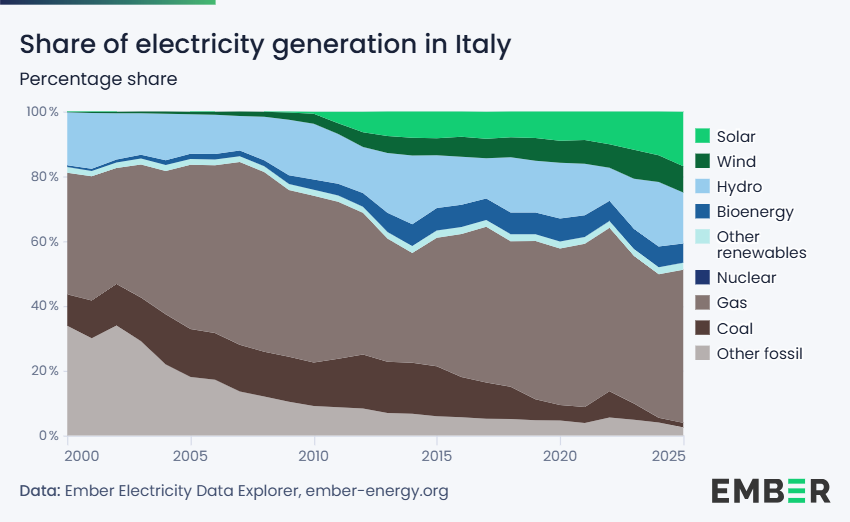
Electricity production in Italy by source (left), and production of renewable electricity in Italy by source (right)

In 2014 Italy consumed 291.083 TWh (4,790 kWh/person) in electricity, consumption in household were 1057 kWh/person. Italy is a net importer of electricity: the country imported 46,747.5 GWh and exported 3,031.1 GWh in 2014. Gross production in 2014 was 279.8 TWh. The main power sources are natural gas and hydroelectricity.

Italy has no nuclear power since it was banished in 1987 by referendum. Italy was the first country to exploit geothermal energy to produce electricity. The first Italian geothermal power plant was built in Tuscany, which is where all currently active geothermal plants in Italy are located. In 2014 the geothermal production was 5.92 TWh.

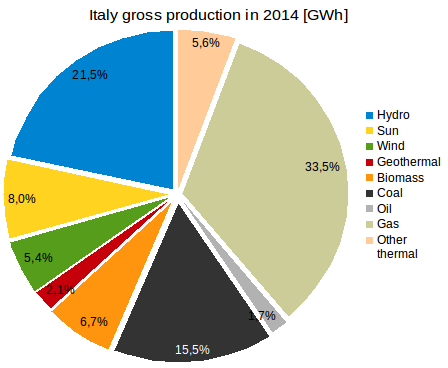
Gross electricity production in Italy in 2014 by sources

Italian gross electricity production by sources in 2014 [TWh]
Hydroelectric	60.256	21.5%
Thermal	176.171	-
of which by Geothermal	5.919	2.1%
of which by Natural Gas	93.637	33.5%
of which by Coal	43.455	15.5%
of which by Oil	4.764	1.7%
of which by Biomass	18.732	6.7%
Wind	15.178	5.4%
Solar	22.306	8.0%

== District heating ==
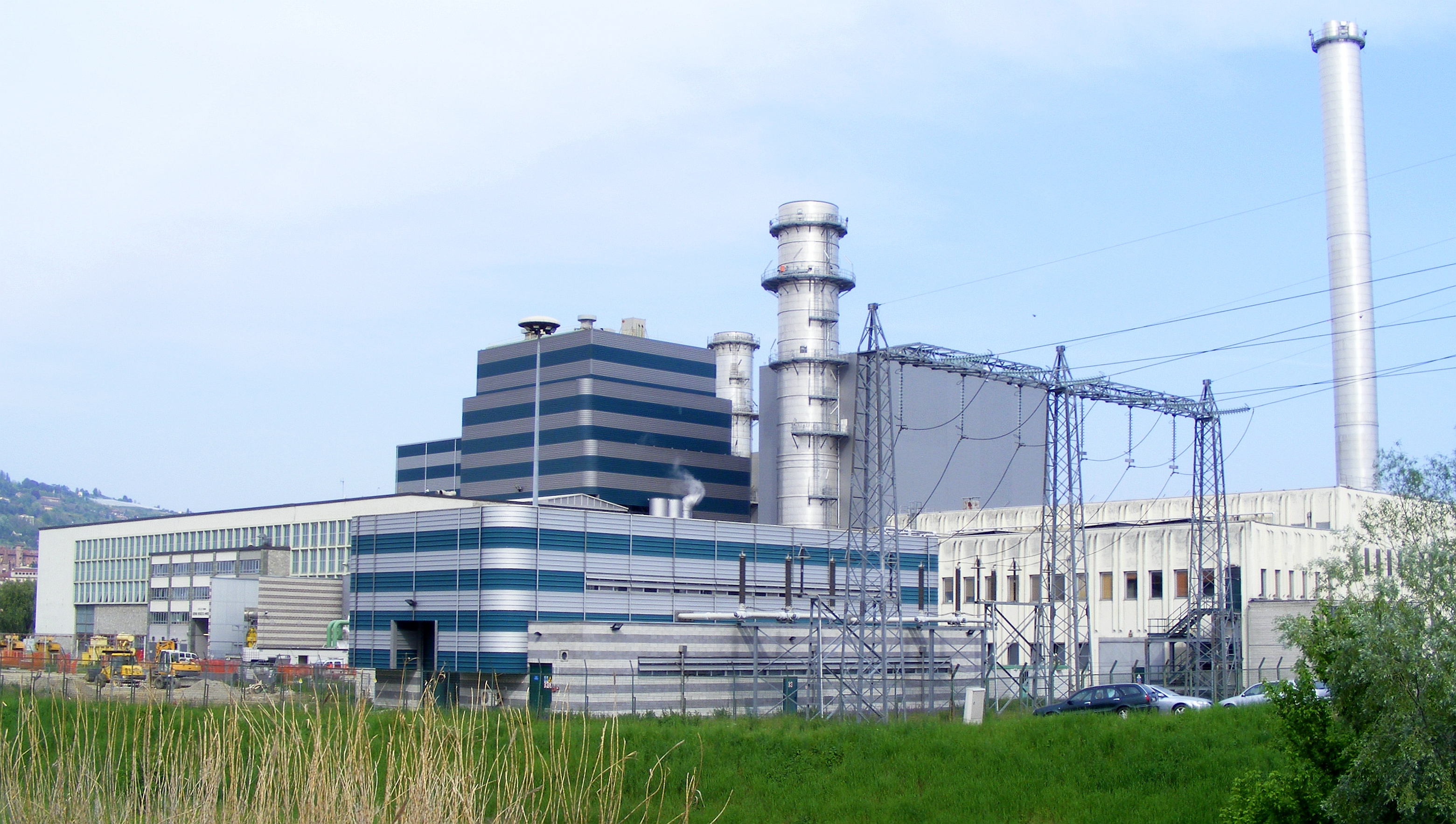
The cogeneration plant of Moncalieri, which supplies heat to the district heating network of the metropolitan area of Turin

District heating is widespread in central, eastern and northern Europe, but since the early 1970s it has also begun to spread to Italy. The first Italian city to adopt a district heating network was Brescia in 1972, followed in 1982 by Turin, which since 2011 has the largest city district heating network in Italy and one of the largest in Europe, while the Italian region that has the largest extension of the district heating network is Lombardy.

The heat produced by cogeneration plants (94%) as well as by boiler rooms (6%) and distributed by district heating represented 174 PJ in 2019, or 3.5% of the country's final energy consumption, intended for 71% to industry, 21% to the residential sector and 7% to the tertiary sector. It was produced in 2020 from coal for 2.7%, oil for 12.9%, natural gas for 63.1%, biomass for 15.6%, waste for 5.3% and geothermal energy for 0.4%. Production increased by 19% between 2005 and 2020. Italy's heat production reached 231 PJ in 2019, i.e. 1.5% of the world total (10th in the world).

== Emissions ==
Development of CO_{2} emissions in Italy

Italy's CO_{2} emissions reached 5.13 tonnes per capita in 2019, 17% higher than the world average (4.39 t/inhab).

Evolution of energy-related CO_{2} emissions
	1971	1990	2018	var. 2018/1971	var. 2018/1990
Emissions (Mt CO_{2})	289.4	389.4	317.1	+9.6 %	-18.6 %
Emissions/capita (t CO_{2})	5.35	6.87	5.25	-1.9 %	-23.6 %
Source : International Energy Agency

The International Energy Agency also provides the emissions for 2019: 302.8 MtCO_{2}, down 4.5% compared to 2018h 1; per capita: 5.02 tCO_{2}.

Energy-related CO_{2} emissions in Italy experienced strong growth until 2005: 456.4 Mt, i.e. +58% in 34 years, then fell to 428.9 Mt in 2008, collapsed in 2009 due to the Great Recession: -10.5% and continued to decline thereafter.

Per capita, Italy emitted 14.5% less than the European Union average (6.14 t/cap) in 2018.

Breakdown by fuel of energy-related CO_{2} emissions
Combustible	1971; Mt CO_{2}	1990; Mt CO_{2}	2018; Mt CO_{2}	%	var. 2018/1990
Coal	32.6	56.6	34.3	11 %	-39.4 %
Oil	232.7	244.8	140.2	44 %	-42.7 %
Natural gas	24.1	87.1	137.6	43 %	+58 %
Source : International Energy Agency

Energy-related CO_{2} emissions by consumption sector*
	2018 emissions	sector share	Emissions/capita
Sector	Million tons CO_{2}	%	tons CO_{2}/hab.
Energy sector excluding elect.	18.1	6 %	0.30
Industry and building	71.3	22 %	1.18
Transport	103.6	33 %	1.72
of which road transport	94.9	30 %	1.57
Residential	67.0	21 %	1.11
Tertiary	47.7	15 %	0.79
Total	317.1	100 %	5.25
Source : International Energy Agency * after re-allocation of emissions from electricity and heat generation to consumption sectors.

== See also ==
- Energy and natural resources of Italy
- Electricity sector in Italy
- Renewable energy in Italy
- Italian Power Exchange
