= IPEX =

IPEX may refer to:

- Immunodysregulation polyendocrinopathy enteropathy X-linked syndrome, a rare disease linked to the dysfunction of the transcriptional activator FoxP3
- Italian Power Exchange
- Interparliamentary EU Information Exchange
- IPEX (trade show), the largest printing and graphic arts trade show in the English-speaking world
- Hirose U.FL or I-PEX, a miniature RF connector for high-frequency signals
