= Wind power in Italy =

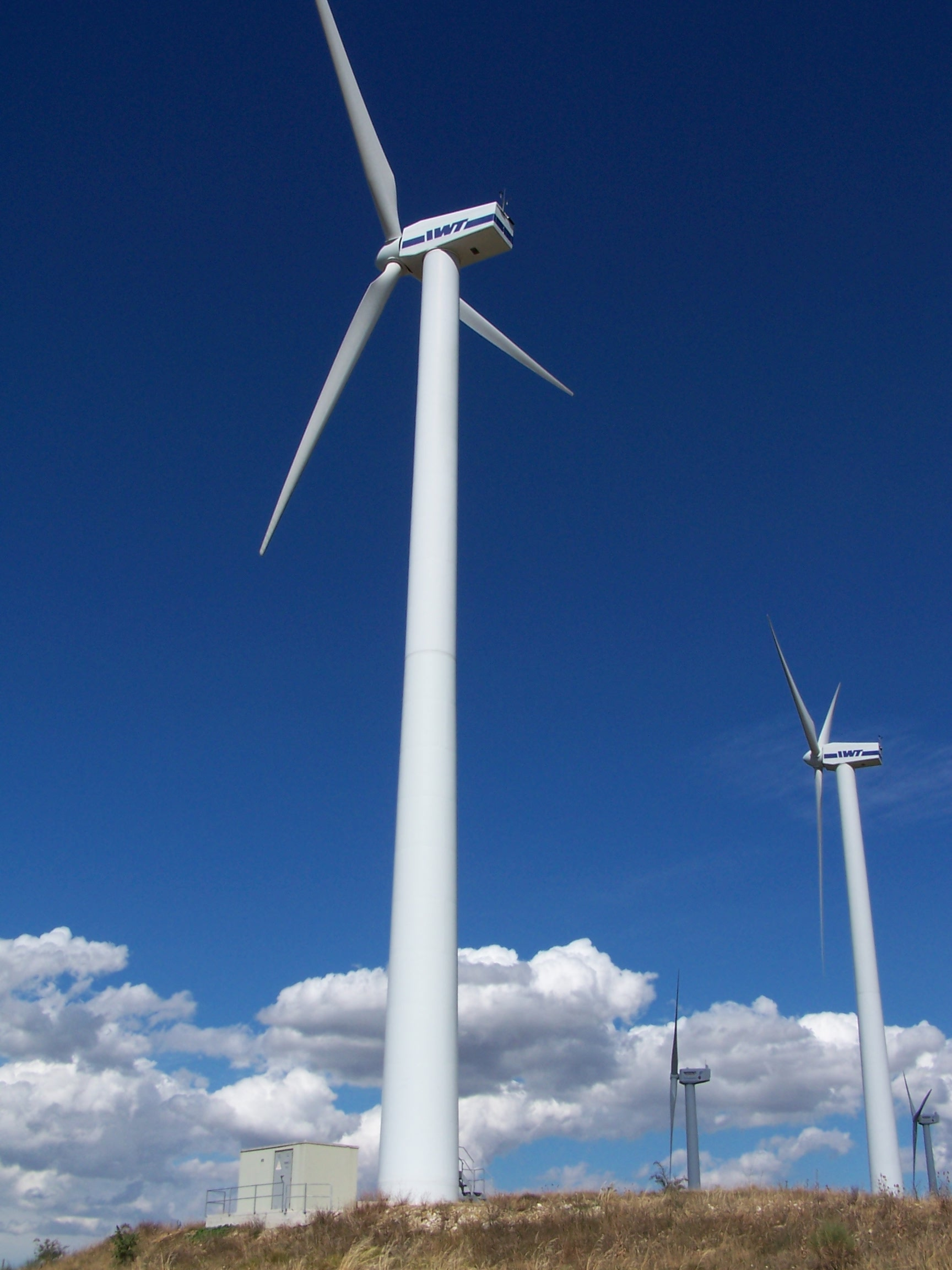
Wind turbines near Frigento, province of Avellino, Campania

Wind power in Italy, at the end of 2015, consisted of more than 1,847 wind turbines with a total installed capacity of 8,958 megawatts. In 2019, Italy generated 20,054 GWh of electricity from wind power, equal to 7.1% of the total electricity generation.

Italy is ranked as the world's tenth producer of wind power as of the end of 2016. Prospects for Italian wind energy beyond 2020 were positive, with several projects planned to go live before 2030.

== Overview ==
Share of wind power in total electricity demand in Europe in 2017 > 40 % 20-30 % 10-20 % < 10 %

In 2001, the European Commission issued its Directive on Electricity Production from Renewable Energy Sources. The Directive set a goal for Italy to obtain at least 25% of its electricity from renewables by 2010. The 1999 Italian ‘White Book’ targeted to install 2,500 MW of wind power capacity by 2010; Italy exceeded this in 2007. The Italian government targeted 12,000 MW by 2020. Given that Italy's recent growth in wind power capacity has been about 30% annually, in 2008 the target appeared reachable by 2015. Italy introduced a renewable energy quota system in 2002, and uses green certificates to ensure that power producers and importers produce specified percentages of electricity from renewables. Renewable energy under the quota system must come from new or repowered plants which began operating after April 1, 1999.

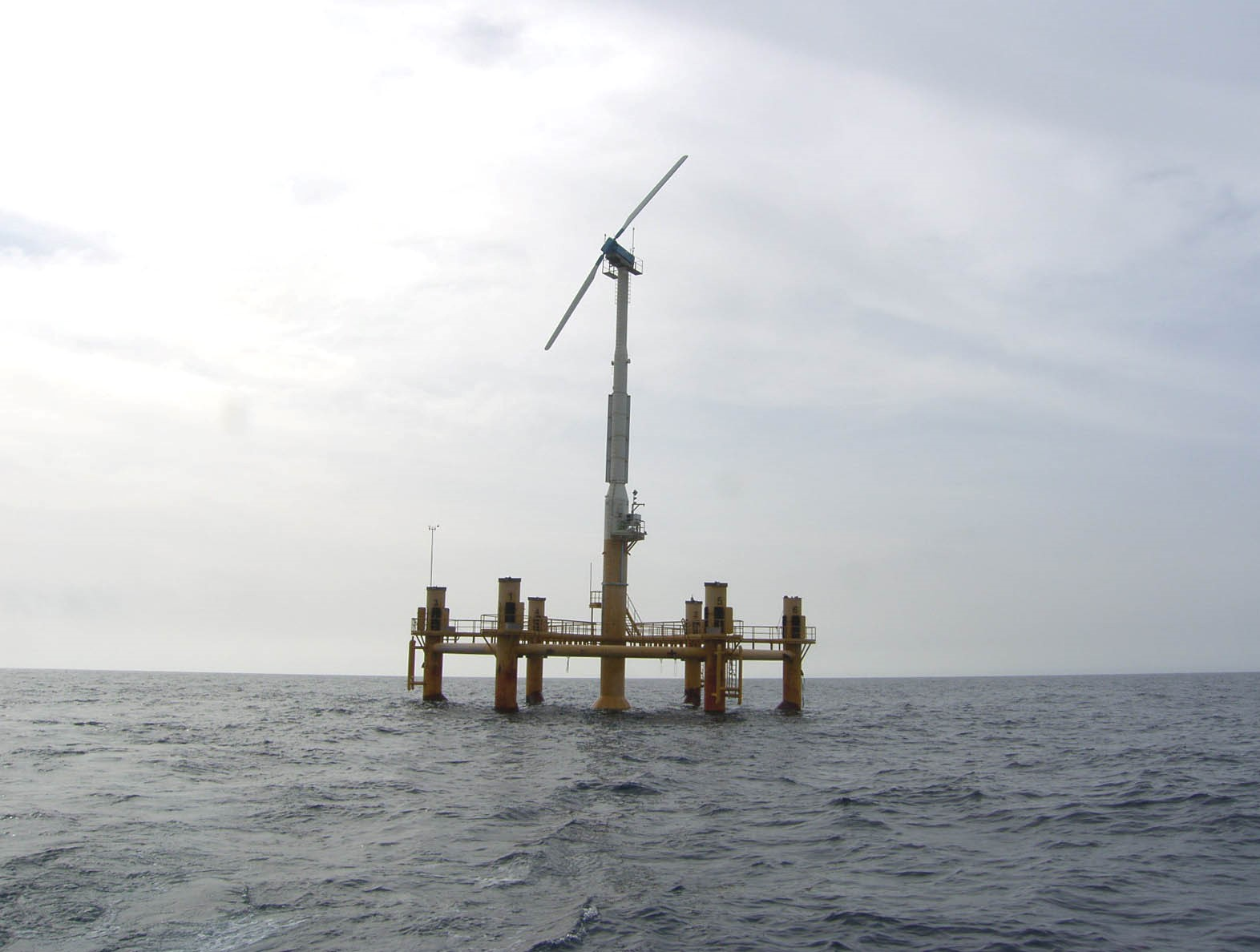
Blue H Technologies - World's first floating wind turbine (80 kW)

The first floating wind turbines were tested in 2007-2008. Blue H Technologies of the Netherlands deployed the world's first floating wind turbine, 21.3 kilometres (13.2 mi) off the coast of Apulia in December 2007. The first foundations for the 30 MW Beleolico offshore wind farm were installed near Taranto in January 2022, and inaugurated in April 2022.

Wind power is an established component of Italy’s renewable energy sector and contributes to the country’s electricity generation mixture. According to the IEA Wind TCP national report, Italy had about 12.1 GW of installed wind power capacity at the end of 2023, generating around 23.4 TWh of electricity and meeting about 7.6% of national demand. Italy’s wind energy capacity is predominantly onshore, with most installations located in southern regions such as Apulia, Campania, Sicily, and Sardinia, where wind conditions are more favorable. Regional data indicate that southern regions amount for the majority of capacity and generation, with Apulia, Sicily, Campania, and others leading the total production capacity. Growth in new onshore wind capacity has faced challenges in recent years, including permitting constraints, landscape protection rules, and local opposition in some areas, which have slowed deployment compared to earlier phases. Industry analysis and wind power reports discuss regulatory and permitting barriers that have affected project timelines.

== Installed capacity growth ==
Wind power installed capacity and generation in Italy

The table shows the annual increase in installed wind power capacity in recent years. Development of wind power expanded steadily over the last decade, with capacity rising from about 8 GW in 2012 to over 12 GW by 2023, reflecting sustained investment in wind farms across Italy. Historical capacity figures show gradual growth in installed wind power since the early 2010s.

Year	Nameplate capacity		Plants	
Year	MW	change	number	change
2000	363	-	55	-
2001	664	82.92%	81	47.27%
2002	780	17.47%	99	22.22%
2003	874	12.05%	107	8.08%
2004	1,131	29.41%	120	12.15%
2005	1,639	44.92%	148	23.33%
2006	1,908	16.41%	169	14.19%
2007	2,714	42.24%	203	20.12%
2008	3,538	30.36%	242	19.21%
2009	4,898	38.44%	294	21.49%
2010	5,814	18.70%	487	65.65%
2011	6,936	19.30%	807	65.71%
2012	8,144	17.42%	1,054	30.61%
2013	8,552	5.01%	1,386	31.50%
2014	8,703	1.77%	1,847	33.26%
2015	9,126	4.86%	2,734	48.02%
2016	9,388	2.87%	3,598	31.60%
2017	9,780	4.18%	5,579	55.06%
2018	10,310	5.42%	5,642	1.13%
2019	10,760	4.36%	5,644	0.04%
2020	10,907	1.37%	5,660	0.28%
2021	11,320	3.79%	5,731	1.25%
2022	11,850	4.68%	5,928	3.44%
2023	12,340	4.14%	6,019	1.54%
2024	13,020	5,51%		

== Offshore wind power ==
As of 2024, Italy’s offshore wind sector remains in its early stages, with about 13 MW of installed capacity and project pipelines under development following new auctions and policy support. Several large offshore wind initiatives, including the Adriatic Offshore Wind Project and the Puglia Offshore Wind Farm, have been proposed, reflecting potential future expansion in the sector.

In 2024, the 7Seas Med floating offshore wind project located off the coast of Sicily received a positive environmental impact assessment, representing a significant step forward for offshore wind development in Italy. In parallel, Italy has a substantial offshore wind project pipeline under environmental review, amounting to more than 81,300 MW of potential offshore capacity, including megawatt-scale initiatives in the Sicilian Strait and Sardinia regions.

In support of these developments, industry partnerships have been formed to advance floating offshore wind infrastructure, such as the 2025 deal between Saipem and the Divento consortium aimed at supporting future Italian offshore wind projects.

== Gallery ==
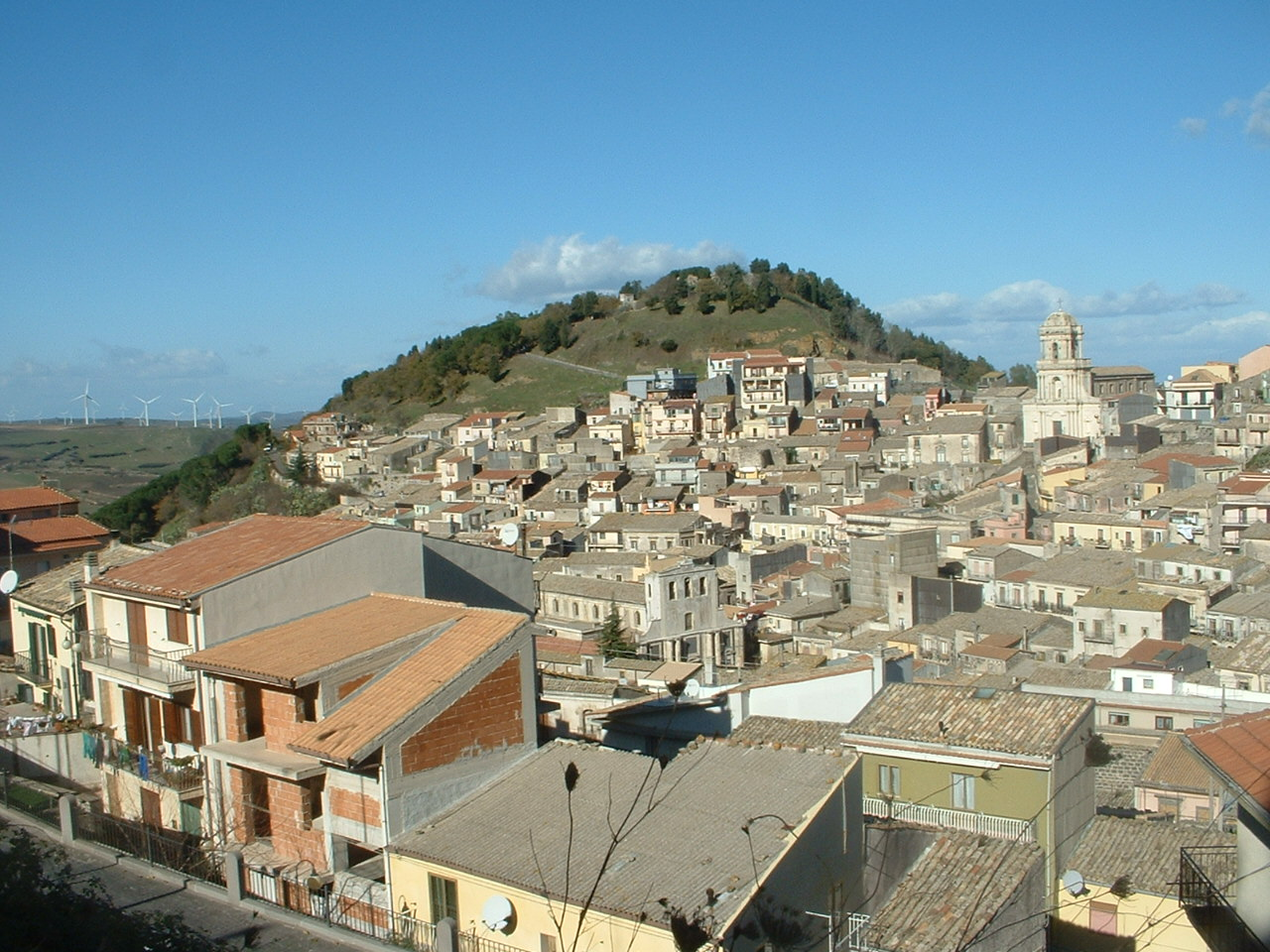
Wind farm in the background of Buccheri, Sicily

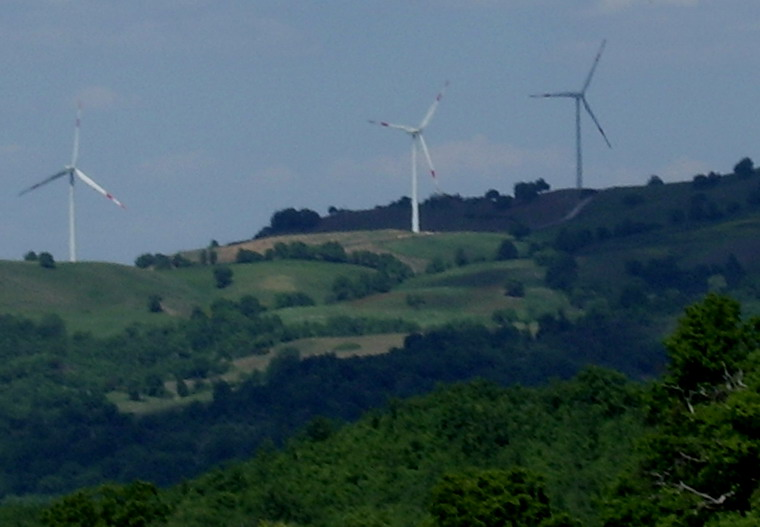
Wind farm near Scansano in the Tuscan province of Grosseto

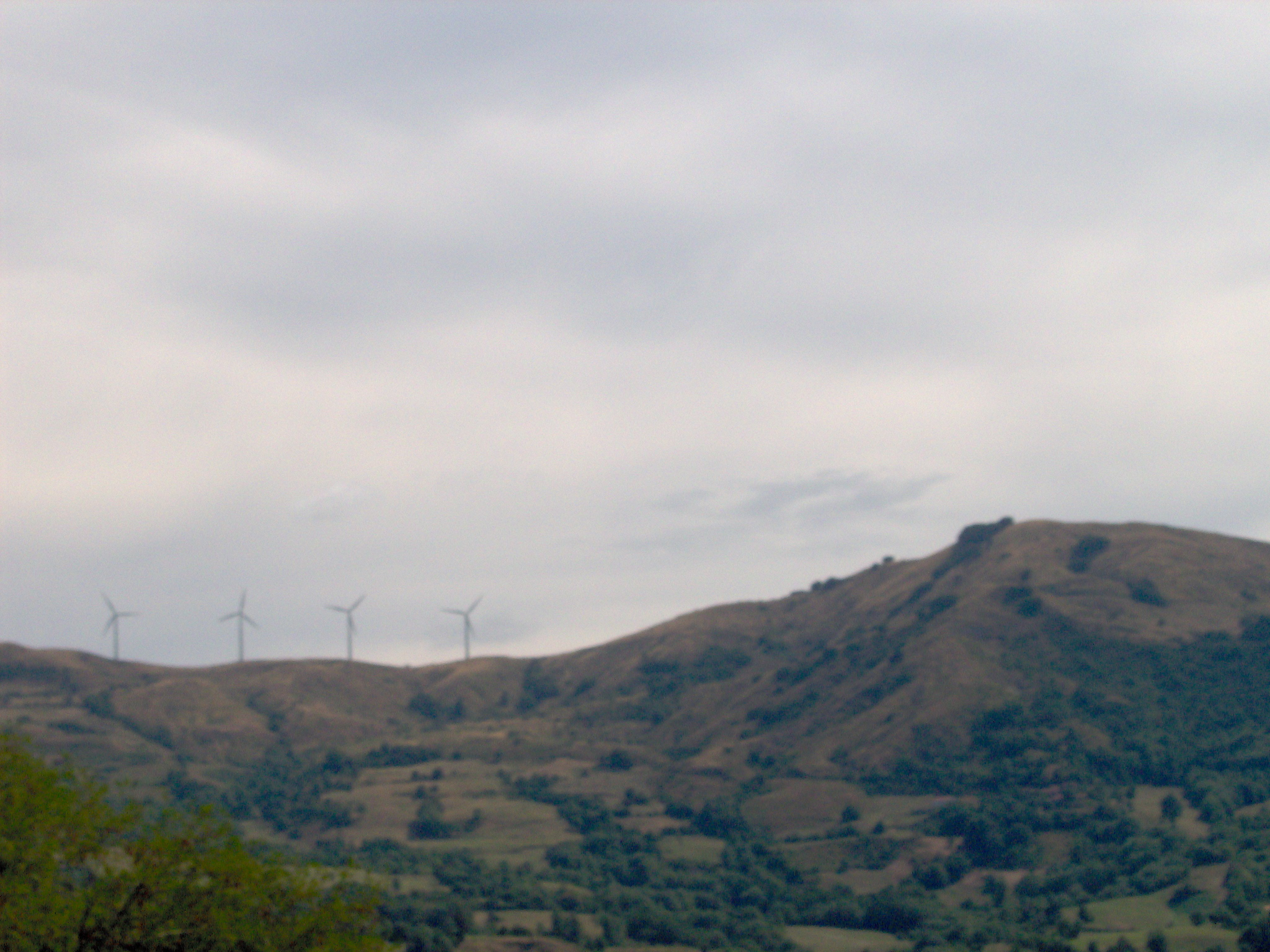
Wind farm in Varese Ligure, Province of La Spezia

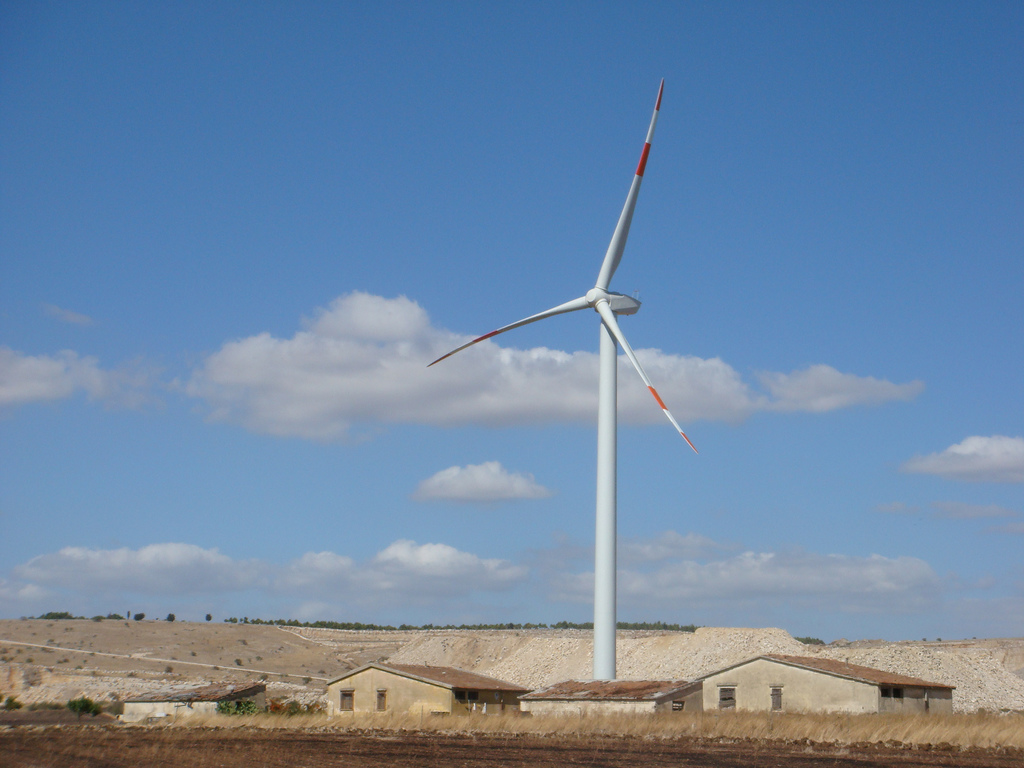
REpower MM82 Wind Turbine in Minervino Murge

== See also ==
- Energy in Italy
- Electricity sector in Italy
- Solar power in Italy
- Geothermal power in Italy
- Hydroelectric power in Italy
- Biofuel in Italy
- Renewable energy in Italy
- European Wind Energy Association
- Global Wind Energy Council
- Wind power in the European Union
- List of wind power stations in Italy
