= Geothermal power in Italy =

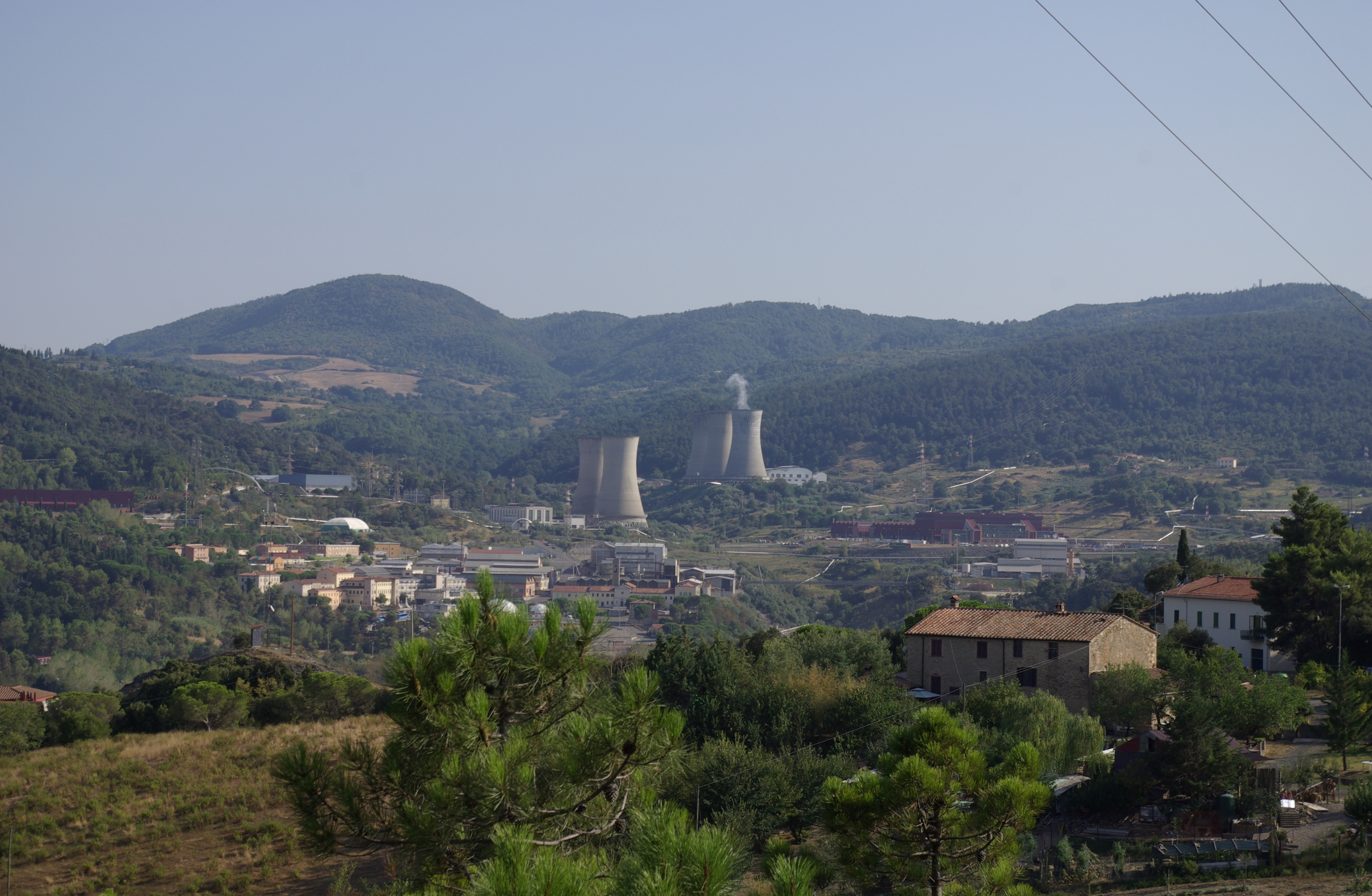
View of Larderello with one of the biggest geothermal plant in Italy

Geothermal power accounted for about 2.1% of the total electric energy production in Italy in 2025, producing a total of 5,7000 GWh of electricity during the year.

Italy was the first country in the world to exploit geothermal energy to produce electricity. The high geothermal gradient that forms part of the peninsula makes potentially exploitable also other provinces: research carried out in the 1960s and 1970s identifies potential geothermal fields in Lazio and Tuscany, as well as in most volcanic islands.

There are 33 active geothermal plants with a total capacity of 772 MW. All the plants are in Tuscany in the provinces of Grosseto, Pisa, and Siena. The province of Pisa alone contributes for more than half of the national production.

== History ==
In the 20th century, demand for electricity led to the consideration of geothermal power as a generating source. Prince Piero Ginori Conti tested the first geothermal power generator on 4 July 1904 in Larderello, in the province of Pisa. It successfully lit four light bulbs. In 1911, the world's first commercial geothermal power plant was built there. Experimental generators were built in other countries in the 1920s, but Italy was the world's only industrial producer of geothermal electricity until 1958.

== Current development ==
On 30 May 2012, Enel Green Power announced the entry into service of the completely new geothermal power station Rancia 2 in the town of Radicondoli, in the province of Siena. The plant, which has a net installed capacity of 17 MW, will be able to generate about 150 GWh per year. The remaking of the central Rancia 2 falls within the group business plan 2012-2016, which envisages an investment package of around 500 million euros for development of geothermal plants in Tuscany.

While the update of Rancia 1 and Le Prata (in the towns of Radicondoli (SI) and Castelnuovo di Val di Cecina (PI) respectively) are in progress, the total renovation will also start soon for the three geothermal plants located in the town of Piancastagnaio (SI).

In 2013, Enel Green Power installed Gruppo Binario Bagnore3–1 MW. It was the first binary cycle power plant in Italy.

== See also ==
- Biofuel in Italy
- Electricity sector in Italy
- Geothermal energy in Italy
- Hydroelectricity in Italy
- List of renewable energy topics by country
- Renewable energy in Italy
- Solar power in Italy
- Wind power in Italy
