= Renewable energy in Italy =

Renewable Energy in Italy

Renewable energy (RE)
- RE as % of gross final energy consumption: 17.1% (2014)
- Target for above: 17.0% (2020)

Renewable electricity
- Percentage of electricity generated by RE: 39% (2023)
- RE generated / total electricity generation: 102 / 264 GWh (2023)
- Record % RE covered electricity consumption: 100% (June16th 2013)

Installed capacity (2025)
- Wind Power: 13.0 GW
- Bio Energy: 4.1 GW
- photovoltaic: 37.0 GW
- Hydro Power: 19.6 GW
- Geothermal: 0.8 GW
- Total: 74.5 GW

Country Notes
- In 2014 Italy had the world's highest solar power penetration; Diverse spread of RE sources; Achieved its 2020 RE targets 6 years early

Renewable energy developed rapidly in Italy between 2005 and 2023, nearly doubling, and provided the country with a means of diversifying from its historical dependency on imported fuels. Solar power accounted for around 17% of the total electric production in the country in 2025. Rapid growth in the deployment of solar, wind, and bio energy in recent years has led to Italy producing over 41% of its electricity from renewable sources in 2025, and adding 7.48 GW (7,480 MW ) capacity in 2024.

The share of renewable energy in gross final energy consumption (all energy uses) had risen to 19.6% in 2023. In 2025, Italy's electricity consumption was at 311 TWh, with 41% of the national electric energy consumption coming from renewable sources (in 2005 this value was 15.4%). The corresponding figure for electricity generation was even higher, as consumption figures are reduced by electricity imports (15% of the total in 2025). Imported electricity may also contain a high proportion of electricity generated from renewable sources, but these are not accounted for in consumption figures.

All 7,895 Italian municipalities (comune) have deployed some source of renewable energy, with hydroelectric power being the leading renewable energy source in terms of energy production. Bio energy, wind power, and geothermal power also make an important contribution to national energy demands.

Italy implemented generous incentive schemes to encourage the development of renewable energy production. Its largest scheme incentivised solar PV production and led Italy from a low base of installed PV in 2010 to become the world's fourth largest country by installations by the end of 2014, ahead of the US at that time. All sources of renewable energy have grown in Italy during recent years, and many continue to receive incentives. Italy has become one of the world's largest producers of renewable energy, ranking as the third largest generator in the European Union and the tenth in the. Though despite this, Italy has been said to be lagging behind other EU nations when it comes to transitioning to renewable energy, with reasons pointing to infrastructure and policy issues within the government.

== History ==
The urge to produce exclusively green energy in Italy came from the need to reduce the country's historical heavy dependence on fossil fuels and supply flows of hydrocarbons coming from Eastern Europe, the Middle East and North Africa, and to comply with the binding international agreements of the Kyoto Protocol (signed in 1997 and implemented in 2005).

During the twentieth century, Italy was at the forefront of technological development and the production of energy from renewable sources. In the field of geothermal energy, the first plant dates back to 1904, at Larderello in Tuscany, where in 1913 the first geothermal power plant was also built, and remained the only one in the world until 1958. With regards to hydropower, the first plant in Europe was built in Paderno d'Adda in Lombardy between 1895 and 1898. In the solar energy industry, the first power plant (that could produce steam at 450 °C) was built in Genoa in 1963, and in 1980 the first solar power tower that uses mirrors was built at Adrano in Sicily. As for the production of wind power, the first experimental projects (sponsored by the National Research Council and in collaboration with Enel) were started in the second half of the seventies as part of the restructuring of the entire system of production and supply of energy that followed the 1973 and 1979 energy crisis.

During the eighties and the nineties renewable energy projects drew new life from three co-occurring factors: the rapid price increase of crude oil (caused by the tension and armed conflicts in the Middle East and Persian Gulf); a new public awareness of environmentalism (fuelled by the Chernobyl disaster in 1986); and the interruption of all construction of nuclear power plants in Italy and the ban on Enel on the participating in the construction or management of nuclear power plants beyond national borders (following the referendum of 1987).

== Renewable energy by sector ==
Projected total gross final energy consumption by sector in 2020 (excluding losses and adjustments)
1. Heating and cooling (48.0%)
2. Electricity (25.3%)
3. Transport (26.7%)

All EU countries as well as Iceland and Norway submitted National Renewable Energy Action Plans (NREAPs) to outline the steps taken, and projected progress by each country between 2010 and 2020 to meet the Renewable Energy Directive. Each plan contains a detailed breakdown of each country's current renewable energy usage and plans for future developments. According to projections by the Italian submission by 2020 the gross final energy consumption in Italy by sector breaks down as follows.

Sector	Projected energy use in 2020 (ktoe)	Renewable share target for 2020
Heating and cooling	61,185	17.09%
Electricity	32,227	26.39%
Transport	33,972	10.14%
Gross final energy consumption*	133,042	17.00%
* Including losses and adjustments

Excluding losses and adjustments almost half of energy consumption (48%) is used in the heating and cooling sector. The heating and cooling sector (also known as the thermal sector) includes domestic heating and air conditioning, industrial processes such as furnaces and any use of heat generally. The next largest share is the transport sector at 26.7%, followed closely by the electricity sector at 25.3%. The proportion of energy use in each sector is similar to that of 2016. In order to meet Italy's overall target for 17% use of renewable energy in Gross final energy consumption (22,617 ktoes) by 2020 targets have been set for each sector as follows: 17% renewable energy use in the heating and cooling sector, 26% in the electricity sector and 10% in the transport sector (see targets below for further details). Total annual energy consumption is projected to be 133,042 ktoe (133 million tonnes of oil equivalent) by 2020.

The energy measures above are gross final energy consumption. Another broader measure, primary energy consumption also includes energy used in the extraction of fuels (the energy sector) and energy lost in transformation (the transformation sector, i.e., converting heat to electricity in power plants or fuel energy to heat in heating plants) as well as gross final energy consumption for end users. Under the European Union Energy Efficiency Directive, EU countries submit their Energy Efficiency Plans every three years. According to Italy's submission in 2014, the country's total final energy consumption in 2012 was 119.01 Mtoes whilst its primary energy consumption was 163.05 Mtoes. Most of the approximately 37% difference is accounted for in losses in the transformation sector. These losses are likely to be most prevalent in thermal electricity sectors; thus, the use of renewable electricity will reduce CO_{2} emissions and fuel losses in the energy and transformation sectors as well as those in final consumption.

=== Electricity sector ===
Italy renewable electricity production by source

==== Renewable electricity by source ====
Share of total gross electricity production in Italy in 2023
Hydroelectric	15.9%
Solar	11.6
Wind	8.9%
Geothermal	2.2%
Total renewable	38.6%

Renewable electricity in Italy 2023 (GWh) by source. Data from terna.it
1. Hydroelectric 42 (40.9%)
2. Photovoltaic 31 (30.2%)
3. Geothermal 5.7 (5.55%)
4. Wind 24 (23.4%)

In 2023 renewable electricity provided around 38% of Italy's total gross electricity production, a similar number to the one reported in 2015, but with biomass burning no longer counted as renewable. Hydroelectric power continued to provide the largest single source of renewable energy generated electricity in 2023 at around 16% of national production, much the same as 2015. Photovoltaic generation provided the next largest share at around 12%, up from 8% in 2015. Wind power almost doubled from 5% to nearly 9%. Geothermal power remained stable since 2015 at 2.2%. The overall change between 2015 and 2023 was therefore the conversion of 8% of total electricity generation from hydrocarbon burning to wind and solar.

==== Growth of renewable electricity ====
Between 2005 and 2011 a surge in renewable energy investments and production took place in Italy, particularly in wind and solar energy during the latter years. Total electricity produced from solar PV quintupled in 2011 compared to the previous year. This was mainly due to a drop in costs and to high incentives introduced since 2005. The Italian fossil fuel electricity generation sector underwent a profound crisis. Many Italian power plants burning fossil fuels were running at half capacity and others were in the process of being shut down.

Renewable gross electricity production (GWh) from renewable sources in Italy, 2010–2015*
	Total gross generation**	Hydro	Solar	Wind	Geothermal	Bio energy	Total renewable	% of total gross generation (est.)
2010	278,196	51,117	1,906	9,126	5,376	9,440	76,965	27.7%
2011	279,009	45,823	10,796	9,856	5,654	10,832	82,961	29.7%
2012	283,220	41,875	18,862	13,407	5,592	12,487	92,223	32.6%
2013	289,803	52,773	21,589	14,897	5,659	17,090	112,008	38.6%
2014	279,829	58,545	22,306	15,178	5,916	18,732	120,677	43.1%
2015	***281,354	43,902	22,847	14,883	6,160	18,894	106,686	37.9%
* Figures in italics represent near estimates. Data for Hydro, Solar, Wind, Geothermal and Bio Energy 2010-2015 from GSE.it, figures for 2015 preliminary estimates. ** Data for Gross generation for years 2010-2014, from Terna.it, General Data 2010,2011,2012,2013,2014 *** Gross generation for 2015 estimated from Net generation figures (and using same ratio between gross and net generation as 2013 figures).

Generation by renewables grew from 76,965 GWh in 2010 to 106,686 GWh by 2015. Non hydroelectric renewable electricity more than doubled during the period growing from 25,848 GWh in 2010 to 62,748 GWh in 2015, a rise from around 9.3% to 22.3% of total gross generation. The largest increase in production took place in solar generated electricity, followed by bioenergy production. Wind power rose by a little over 60% during the period, whilst geothermal production rose by a little under 15%. Normalised (averaged) hydroelectric statistics suggest a slight upward trend in generation despite wet and dry years influencing the overall production in any given year. Bio nergy includes production from biomass, biogas, bioliquids and the renewable share of municipal waste used as fuel in waste-to-energy generation. Further information on bioenergy production is available under the heading "Sources" below.

Percentage of electricity produced from renewable sources in Italy, 2010–2015 (estimated figures as above)

Electricity production potential from renewables has been rising, but hydroelectric production figures vary considerably from one year to the next, which accounts for the fall in 2015. Production of electricity from renewable sources reached a record in 2014 of around 43% of total gross electricity generation. In 2015 production from wind, photovoltaic and geothermal sources almost matched hydroelectric production for the first time.

==== Installed capacity ====
Total renewable electricity installed capacity, Italy 2010-2019 (MW)
	Hydro	Wind	Solar	Geothermal	Bio energy	Total
2010	17,876	5,814	3,470	772	2,352	30,284
2011	18,092	6,936	12,773	772	2,825	41,398
2012	18,232	8,119	16,690	772	3,802	47,614
2013	18,366	8,561	18,185	773	4,033	49,919
2014	18,418	8,703	18,609	821	4,044	50,595
2015	18,543	9,162	18,892	821	4,057	51,475
2016	18,641	9,410	19,269	815	4,124	52,258
2017	18,862	9,766	19,682	813	4,135	53,259
2018	21,900	10,300	20,100	4400		56,700
2019	21,900	10,800	20,900	4800		58,400
2024	19,600	12,990	37,000	817	4,061	74,508

The total installed capacity of renewable electricity sources grew from 30,284 MW in 2010 to 74,508 MW by 2024. The greatest increase was in solar power, which passed 40GW in August 2025. Wind power grew fairly strongly over the period but was overtaken by solar in 2011. Hydroelectricity is a mature technology in Italy.

=== Heating and cooling sector ===
Renewable energy in the heating and cooling sector, 2014
Source	(ktoe)	Estimated share of total sector (all sources)
Biomass	7,045	13.4%
of which: solid biomass	6,646	12.6 %
biogas	283	-0.5 %
bio liquids	31	0.1 %
Municipal share of renewable waste	85	0.2%
RE from heat pumps	2,580	4.9%
Solar	180	0.3%
Geothermal	130	0.2%
Total	9,934	18.89%

Renewable energy in the heating and cooling sector, 2009-2014
	2009	2010	2011	2012	2013	2014
RE share of sector	16.43%	15.64%	13.82%	16.98%	18.10%	18.89%

Every two years all EU countries as well as Iceland and Norway submit Progress Reports outlining their renewable energy development and movement towards meeting their 2020 renewable energy targets. Between 2009 and 2014 renewable energy share in the heating and cooling sector grew from 16.43% to 18.89%. In 2014 Biomass provided the largest share of RE in the heating and cooling sector at 13.4% of the total, equating to just over 7 million tonnes of oil equivalent. RE from heat pumps provided almost 5% of the total sector, an area in which Italy is more developed than most countries. Solar and geothermal power provided a contribution of 0.3% and 0.2%, respectively.

The Italian government has identified measures to increase the use of renewable energy and energy efficiency in the heating and cooling sector as outlined in the 2009 Italian National Renewable Energy Action Plan. These include an energy efficiency credits scheme which was expected to save 6 Mtoe by 2012. A 55% tax relief for building and refurbishment projects due to be reviewed by 2010. The report outlined a plan for regulating a minimum quota of 50% (20% for buildings in historic centres) of domestic hot water being produced by renewable energy targeting newly constructed buildings or buildings to be refurbished. From 1999 tax credits were made available for district heating using either geothermal or biomass energy. Tax relief for specific measures is included to encourage the replacement of old boilers and chimneys with high-energy efficiency and low-emission biomass boilers. Legislation in Italy allows biogas to be injected into the natural gas system where there are no technical issues.

The report identified the possibility of boosting the development of district heating and cooling by making use of biomass from agriculture and forestry, through heat extracted from cogeneration, and utilizing sorted waste. It also seeks to promote the use of biomass in agricultural and industrial areas and the provision for geothermal heat transport networks serving manufacturing and residential areas.

Renewable energy use in the heating and cooling sector 2010-2015 (Mtoe)

	2010	2011	2012	2013	2014	*2015
Geothermal	0.14	0.14	0.13	0.13	0.13	0.13
Solar thermal	0.13	0.14	0.16	0.17	0.18	0.19
Bio energy	7.65	5.55	7.52	7.78	7.04	7.69
Renewable energy from heat pumps	2.09	2.27	2.42	2.52	2.58	2.58
Thermal sector total	10.02	8.10	10.23	10.60	9.93	10.59

* Provisional data.

Total renewable energy use grew in the thermal sector by just a little over 5% between 2010 and 2015 from 10.02 Mtoe to 10.59 Mtoe. The main areas of growth were in solar thermal and renewable energy from heat pumps.

=== Transport sector ===
Renewable energy in the transport sector, 2014
Source	ktoe	Estimated share of total sector (all sources)
Biodiesels	1,055	4.00%
Bioethanol	8	0.03%
Renewable electricity	119	0.45%
Hydrogen	0	0.00%
Total	*1,310	4.48%
* Adjusted figure, after multiplier adjustment figure is 1,498 for Nreap transport target

Renewable energy in the transport sector, 2009-2014
Years 2009-2014	2009	2010	2011	2012	2013	2014
RE share of sector	3.68%	4.57%	4.66%	5.68%	4.93%	4.48%

According to the Italian Progress Report submitted to the European Commission between 2009 and 2014 renewable energy share in the transport sector grew slightly from 3.68% in 2009 to 4.48% in 2014. As of 2016 the use of renewable energy in the transport sector remains well behind the other energy sectors in most countries. Biodiesels provided the largest share of RE in the transport sector at 4% of the total. Renewable electricity provided 0.45% of the sector's requirements, most of it in public transport uses. Bioethanol also provided a small contribution at 0.03% of the total.

The 2009 Italian National Renewable Energy Action Plan outlined existing and planned developments for encouraging renewable energy use in the transport sector. From 2007 Italy introduced a minimum quota of 4.5% of biofuels to be fed into the network by 2012. A reduction in the tax on biofuels was also introduced prior to 2010. Plans were also outlined to increase the minimum quota and to promote second and third generation biofuels and to make use of biofuels obtained from waste and raw material of non-food origin. Promoting biomethane and electricity to power transport is also included in the report. Biodiesel in Italy is produced from rapeseed, soybeans, and sunflower seeds.

The country has planned to subsidize electric cars. Transport accounts for a large amount of fossil fuel use so a quick transition to electric cars and public transport will be a key element of the transition to renewable energy use.

Sales of electric and hybrid cars in Italy totalled 1,110 units in 2014 but 65,000 in 2024 corresponding to just 4% of total car sales. Incentives for electric vehicles have been criticised for being ineffective and many Italian households still have electricity contracts that stipulate peak consumption limits.

Italy's biodiesel production totalled approximately 2.5 Mt in 2015. Biodiesel is produced mainly from imported rape seed (40%), soybean (30%) and palm oil (25%). The small amount remaining is made from recycled vegetable oils, sunflower oil and vegetable fat. Rapeseed oil is mostly imported from EU countries, and soybean oil is imported from the EU or made from imported beans. Palm oil is mainly imported from Malaysia and Indonesia. Biodiesel is blended with standard diesel for transport use or used for heating.

Italy also produces bioethanol and production in 2014 was approximately 215,000 Metric Tons per year. Bioethanol is made from corn and wheat, wine and wine by-products. Most of the bioethanol is used for industrial chemicals but a small portion is used for transport use.

== Sources ==
=== Hydroelectricity ===
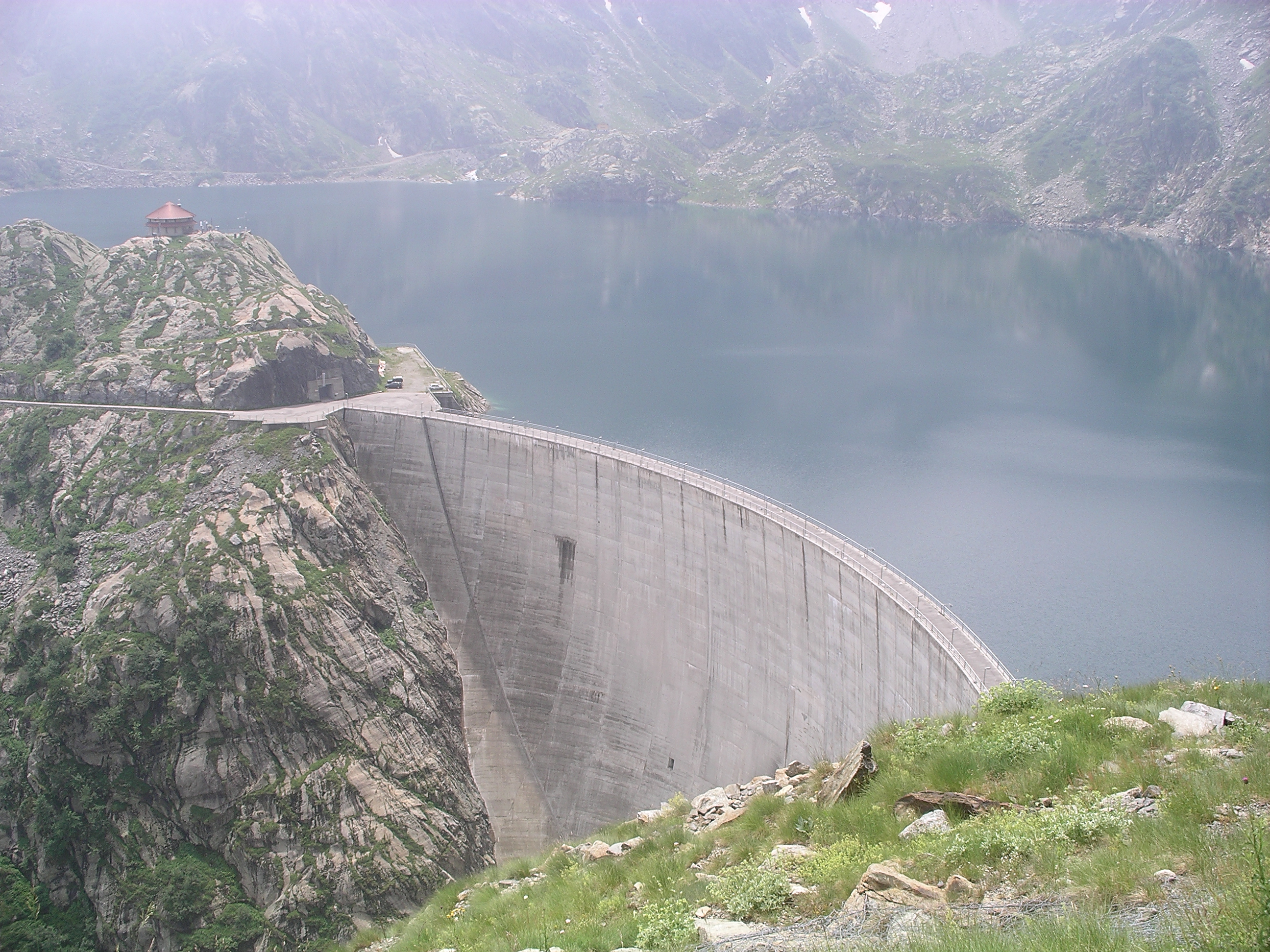
Chiotas Dam at Entracque

As of 2025, Italy has 4,928 hydropower plants with an installed capacity of 21.579 GW. Though depending on levels of drought, hydroelectric production varies considerably from year to year. 2024 saw a record year in production at 52,076 GWh, contributing to 42% of Italy's total renewable electricity production for that year. From the turn of the century to the beginning of the 1960s, hydroelectricity dominated the share of electricity production in Italy, and this source has a long history in the peninsula and reflects Italy's mountainous geography and high water runoff. Some of Italy's largest hydroelectric plants operate pumped storage, providing the country with a means of balancing and storing the variable output from the country's growing solar and wind power facilities. Studies show that pumped storage hydroelectric plants contribute to grid flexibility, reducing carbon emissions by charging and discharging in response to market conditions and renewable variability.

=== Solar power ===
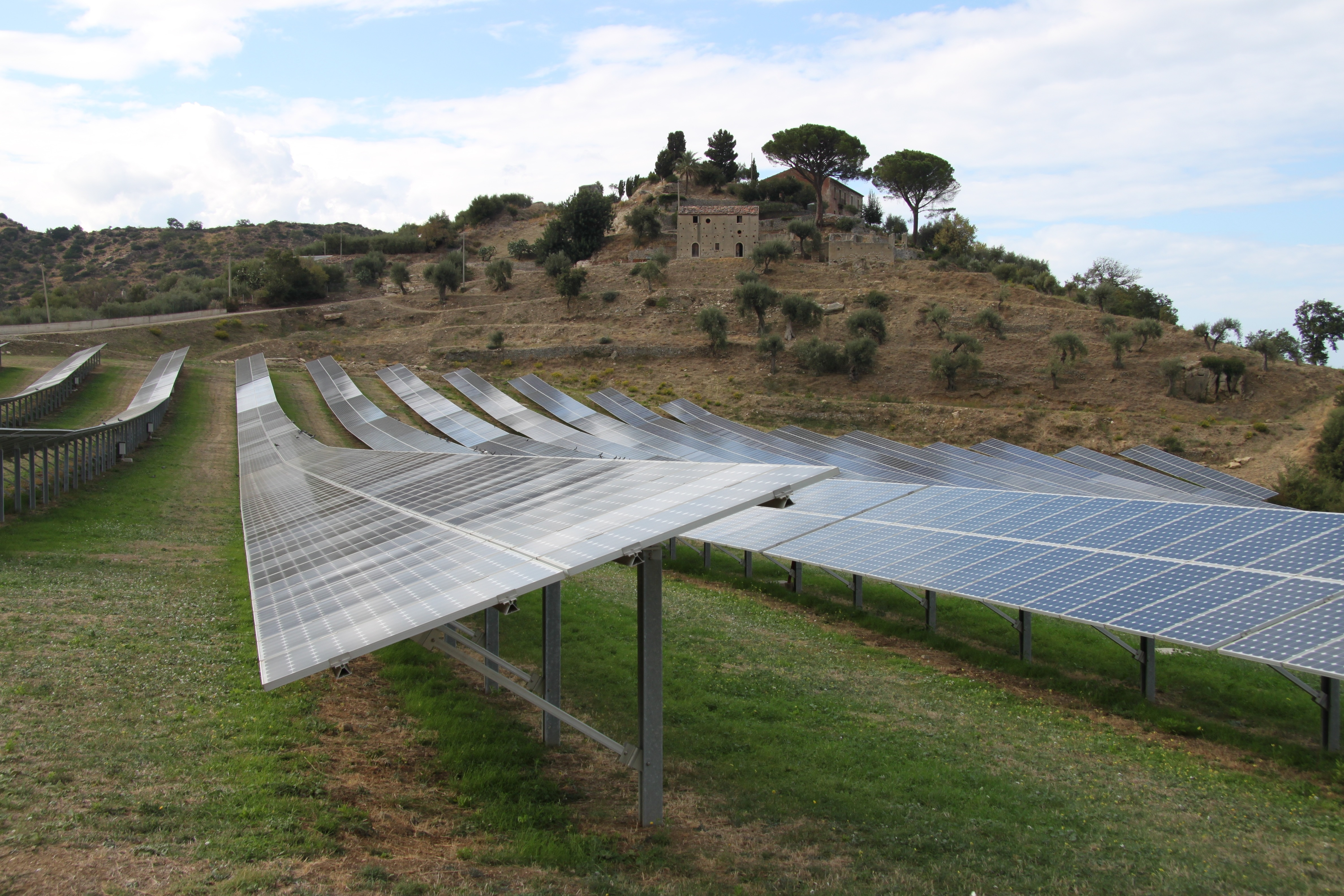
Photovoltaic power station in Mazzarrà Sant'Andrea, Sicily

The installed capacity of solar PV power was 40GW in July 2025, with 6.8 GW of new solar capacity added in 2024. With a total of 2 million grid-connected photovoltaic systems (PV). In 2014, Italy was the world's leading country in terms of solar power coverage of domestic electricity supply, with around 8% of total electricity generation being sourced from solar. With an installed capacity of 18,609 MW, the country was second only to Germany (38,301 MW) in the EU in terms of total capacity and fourth in the world behind the other leading countries, China and Japan. With its capacity greater than that of the United States in 2014 (18,280 MW) ranked fifth in the world at that time. Though after 2014, due to abrupt policy changes, creating market turmoil, leading to withdrawals of domestic and foreign investment. This quickly plateaued Italy's expansion in solar energy due to a lack of investment, with Spain quickly surpassing. Furthermore, the speed of development of solar power in Italy was heavily influenced by a government incentive scheme, the "Conto Energia", designed as a feed-in tariff for solar PV-generated electricity. Since the ending of the Conto Energia incentive scheme in 2013, installations of solar PV have continued, but at a slower rate. The government has indicated that it intends to focus funding incentives more on other sources of renewable energy in the future. To do this, Italy plans on simplifying bureaucratic procedures for new projects in order to achieve its future goal of 79 GW of solar PV capacity by 2030. ember-greater-policy-support-solar-on-track-2030-targets.

=== Wind power ===
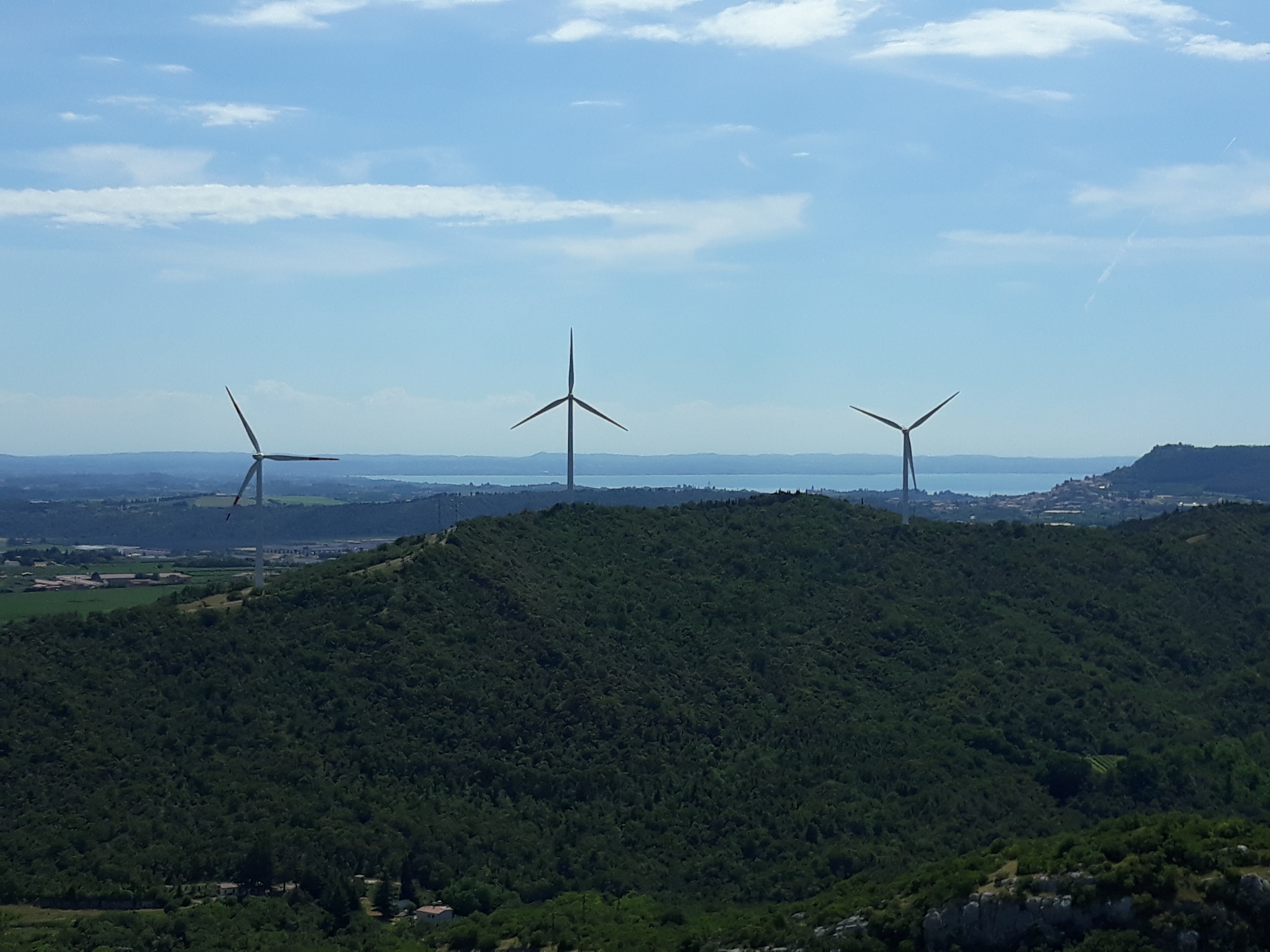
Monte Mesa wind farm

The installed capacity of wind power was 13,768 MW of wind capacity in 2026. Growth in windpower has not been at the breakneck speed of solar power, and the developed potential in Italy remains somewhat moderate. Though with new talks of offshore wind power. which has been described as promising in facilitating the rapid growth of wind power. Italy has a long coastline, which makes it an important hub for offshore wind power, promoting the overall growth and market of Italy's windpower. It is far behind its western Mediterranean neighbour, Spain (31,679 MW), and behind other wind pioneering countries, such as Germany and record-breaking Denmark in terms of realised potential. After its original peak in 2012, the installed capacity grew in 2015 whilst production fell slightly in that year, demonstrating that wind power can vary somewhat from year to year but not as dramatically as hydroelectric power.

=== Geothermal power ===
Italy was the first country in the world to exploit geothermal energy to produce electricity. Today, all of the geothermal energy is produced by Enel Green Power, an international, world-leading renewable energy corporation focused on accelerating the energy transition around the world. The high geothermal gradient that forms part of the peninsula makes it potentially exploitable also in other regions; research carried out in the 1960s and 1970s identified potential geothermal fields in Lazio and Tuscany, as well as in most volcanic islands. With 34 total production plants, production is based in Central Italy, almost entirely in Tuscany, particularly around the city of Pisa. Installed capacity grew from 772 MW in 2010 to 916 MW by 2024, with an intended installed capacity of 1,140 by 2030. Geothermal power production has been on a slow upward trend since 2010, producing an estimated 5,269 GWh of electricity in 2024, placing Italy 8th in the world for geothermal energy.

=== Bioenergy ===
The production of electricity from bio energy more than doubled during the primary expansion period of the last decade, growing from 9,4400 GWh in 2010 to 19,400 GWh by 2024. Production from Bioenergy rose most rapidly in the years to 2014, with production levels stabilizing and plateauing averaging 17,000 to 19,000 GWh annually. While bioenergy has historically led in electricity production in Italy, wind energy has recently over taken bioenergy, reaching 23,400 GWhy in 2024 compared to bioenergy 13,050 GWh. Despite the slight shift in ranking, bioenergy does remain an important mode of producing renewable energy, accounting for 10.2% of italys total renewable generation in 2024. As National policies shifted between 2024 and 2025, total bioenergy production slipped as incentives toward production of Biomethane for transportation rather than elecetricy was prioritzed.

Bioenergy use by sector, 2025
Bioenergy source	Electricity sector GWh (ktoe)*	Heating and cooling sector (ktoe)
Solid biomass	98,416 (8,462)	78,124
Biogas	16,870 (1,450)	4,210
Bioliquids	5,420 (466)	580
Renewable share of municipal waste	21,248 (1,827)	1,025
Total	141,954 (12,205)	83,939
*Converted using IEA unit converter.

== Renewable energy subsidies ==
Italy has administered a comprehensive range of feed-in tariffs and incentives for renewable energy producers. The rationale for a feed-in tariff (FIT) in the power sector is that incentives spur the development of production capacity, technology and economies of scale in emerging renewable energy sources. As a technology develops its costs should fall as it becomes more competitive with other energy sources. Thus it should be possible to reduce the incentive support as the costs of installation fall. If support is withdrawn too quickly the new technology may not have a chance to establish itself as a viable option or if support is withdrawn too slowly costs may rise. Eventually the new energy sources may reach grid parity in which case they should be competitive options without any further support, or in the best case scenario a highly cost effective, secure and environmentally friendly option. The outcome of the final renewable energy mix in Italy has been influenced by the administration and design of the incentive schemes. In designing feed-in tariff and incentive schemes a wide range of factors and objectives are taken into account. Schemes can be designed to be limited by total cost or capacity installation quotas for each type of energy source. The level of incentive is specified and incentives may be changed at intervals in response to changes in market conditions and changing technology costs. A higher incentive will yield a quicker pace of installation but be more costly. The real value of the incentive may change as the costs of installing new capacity rises or falls. Different types of renewable energy sources may receive greater or fewer incentives depending on the desired energy mix outcome. Incentives may be different for smaller or larger producers and for urban and countryside locations, for newer or more developed types of renewable energy. In Italy the main incentive schemes are as follows:

=== Solar PV and the Conto Energia ===
In 2005 the Italian government introduced the first Conto Energia scheme, a feed-in tariff (FIT) system granting incentives specifically for electricity generated by photovoltaic (PV) solar systems and plants connected to the grid. The payments for these were designed to be made over a 20-year period and to incentivise both smaller and larger producers to invest in the installation of photovoltaic plants and systems. Between 2005 and 2013 five different Conto Energia schemes were introduced by ministerial decree. Each scheme had differing terms and conditions and tariffs provided to producers.

Summary of the costs and the power installed under Conto Energia schemes 1-5
	Conto Energia 1	Conto Energia 2	Conto Energia 3	Conto Energia 4	Conto Energia 5	Total
Date of decree -	28 July 2005; 6 February 2006	19 February 2007 -	6 August 2010 -	5 May 2011 -	5 July 2012 -	6 July 2013; Final scheme ended
MW installed	163.4	6,791.2	1,566.6	7,600.4	2,094.9	18,216.6
Yearly cost (million Euro)	95.2	3,270.1	648.9	2,469.0	216.9	6,700.0
Yearly cost per kW installed (Euro, estimated)	582	482	414	325	104	368

The first Conto Energia resulted in the relatively small amount of 163 MW of new PV power installations, perhaps because solar power was still in its infancy in 2005.

The second Conto Energia introduced in 2007 resulted in a massive increase of 6,791 MW of new PV power at an annual cost of €3.27 billion and was the most costly scheme. Almost half of the total cost of the scheme is accounted for by Conto Energia 2.

Conto Energia 3 ran briefly resulting in 1,567 MW of installed power at an annual cost of €0.65 billion. This was succeeded by Conto Energia 4 which resulted in the largest increase in solar capacity so far at 7,600 MW of installed power at the annual cost of €2.47 billion. More solar capacity was added under Conto Energia 4 then took place even under Conto Energia 2 and at a lower cost.

The final Conto 5 was introduced by ministerial decree in 2012 and it was announced that the feed in tariff would end once the total annual costs of cumulative Conto Energia reached €6.7 billion. This figure was reached in 2013 and the final Conto Energia scheme was ended on 6/7/2013. The final scheme resulted in a further 2,095 MW of installed capacity at a cost of €0.22 billion. Under the Conto Energia incentive scheme a total of 18,217 MW of installed solar PV power was added at annual cost of €6.7 billion.

=== Other incentives and RES-E counter ===
In addition to the Conto Energia scheme, which provides incentives solely for solar photovoltaic generated electricity, there are a range of different incentive schemes for other sources of renewable energy generated electricity as well. Incentives typically last between 15 and 30 years. These are listed as follows:

- CIP 6
- Green Certificates
- All inclusive feed in tariffs
- Solar thermodynamic feed-in scheme
- Incentives introduced by the ministerial decree dated 6/7/2012

The total cost of these schemes is updated on the GSE.it website under the RES-E counter. The maximum total cost of the schemes has an upper limit of €5.8 billion annually (established in the ministerial decree dated 6/7/92) and the RSE E counter updated to 31/1/16 stood at €5.634 billion. As of the end of January 2016 this effectively means that the funding applying to the schemes above is nearing its end with around €166 million of funding remaining. The following table shows the distribution of funding across different categories of renewable energy and by scheme:

Total annual cost of incentive by renewable electricity energy type and incentive scheme (million €) RES-E counter to 31 Jan 2016 (elaborated data)
Support category	Hydro	Wind	Waves	Geothermal	Biomass	Bioliquids	Biogasses	Solar thermal	Total by support category
Green Certificates	771.0	1,398.6	0.0	124.4	373.1	328.3	82.4		3,077.9
All inclusive feed in tariffs	282.5	5.6	0.0	0.0	79.5	99.8	1,321.6		1,788.9
Cip 6	0.0	3.8			172.9		3.1		179.8
Not in-service plants MD 6 Jul. 2012	67.6	51.3	0.0	0.0	109.6	2.0	73.8		304.3
In-service plants MD 6 Jul. 2012	89.8	95.0	0.0	16.7	24.7	0.2	55.2		281.6
Solar thermodynamic feed-in scheme								1.3	1.3
Total annual cost	1,210.9	1,554.3	0.0	141.1	759.8	430.3	1,536.1	1.3	5,634.0

Gathering together the total annual costs of incentives applied to each renewable energy source, the following table and chart show these in order of size:

Indicative summary of all annual renewable electricity incentives, million Euro (total photovotaic counter and RES-E counter to 31/1/16 based on tables above)
Source	million Euro
Solar PV	6,700.0
Wind	1,554.3
Biogas	1,536.1
Hydro	1,210.9
Biomass	759.8
Bioliquids	430.3
Geothermal	141.1
Solar thermal	1.3
Waves	0.0

By 31 January 2016 incentives for renewable electricity energy production under the above schemes were running at around total of €12.334 billion per year. These were distributed as follows:

Solar PV production accounted for over half of the total figure at an annual cost of €6.7 billion. Next came wind at €1.554 billion, biogas at €1.536 billion and hydroelectricity at €1.210 billion. Biomass received €760 million, bioliquids €430 million and geothermal power €141 million. Solar thermal received an annual incentive of €1.3 million whilst wave power registered no incentive.

With the incentives for Conto Energia now closed and the incentives for other forms of renewable energy nearing their limit of €5.8 billion per year at €5.634 billion as of 31 January 2016, a further €166 million per year remained to be distributed amongst non solar PV renewable energy sources.

=== Conto Termico ===
The conto termico was introduced by ministerial decree on 28/12/12. It provides incentives for renewable energy production as well as efficiency savings in the heating and cooling sector. The total value of the incentives available are €900 million per year with payments lasting 2–5 years. The fund is divided into €200 million available to the public sector and €700 million available to the private sector. The size of the fund allocated is updated on the GES website Conto Termico Counter.

== Current targets and progress ==
=== Targets ===
The Italian National Renewable Energy Action Plan (NREAP) has a target to bring the total share of renewable energy in the final total energy consumption to 17%. In order to achieve this RE is targeted to account for 26% in the electricity sector, 17% in the heating/cooling sector and 10% in the transport sector by 2020. The precise targets for each sector agreed in the energy plan are shown in the table below.

NREAP targets for 2020
Sector	Mtoe	% Share
Gross final energy consumption from renewables	22.62	17.00%
Electricity sector	8.50	26.39%
Heating and cooling (thermal) sector	10.46	17.09%
Transport sector	2.53	10.14%
Imports	1.13	-
Gross final national energy consumption	133.04	17.00%

=== Progress ===
The following table shows the actual progress achieved in terms of renewable energy use in the years 2010–2015.Information is provided on the electricity sector, the heating and cooling sector, the transport sector and the overall share of renewable energy use as a percentage of total energy use in Italy.

Progress in gross final energy consumption from renewables 2010-2015:
Renewable energy by sector (Mtoe)	2010	2011	2012	2013	2014	2015*	% change 2010–2015
Renewables share of gross final national energy consumption	13.0%	12.9%	15.4%	16.7%	17.1%	17.3%	% change 2010–2015
Gross final energy consumption from renewables	17.36	16.51	19.62	20.74	20.25	21.14	+21.8%
Electricity sector	5.92	7.01	8.03	8,88	9.25	9.37	+58.3%
Heating and cooling sector (thermal) Sector	10.02	8.10	10.23	10.60	9.93	10.59	+5.7%
Transport sector (biofuels)	1.42	1.40	1.37	1.25	1.06	1.18	-16.9%
Gross final national energy consumption	133.32	128.21	127.05	123.86	118.60	122.21	-8.3%
* Preliminary estimates

Italy had a 17% renewable energy target in its total energy use set by the European Union for 2020 and had already exceeded this target by 2014, reaching 17.1%. Gross final energy consumption from renewables rose from 17.36 Mtoe in 2010 to 21.14 Mtoe by the end of 2015. Most of the growth occurred in the electricity sector which increased by 58.3%. The thermal sector registered a much smaller rise of 5.7% whilst the transport sector showed a fall of 16.9%. Italy's overall renewable energy target for 2020 was effectively met by 2014. However this is partially due to a reduction in total gross energy consumption from all sources and if it were to rise again the overall percentage target of renewable energy could fall short without some further expansion in sources. There is still a shortfall in the target for the transport sector which has performed poorly compared to the other sectors.

On June 16, 2013, renewables covered 100% of the entire Italian electricity demand for two hours.

== See also ==
- Wind power in Italy
- Solar power in Italy
- Geothermal power in Italy
- Hydroelectricity in Italy
- Electricity sector in Italy
- Energy in Italy
- Energy policy of the European Union
- Renewable energy in the European Union
- Renewable energy commercialization
- List of countries by renewable electricity production
