= Geothermal energy in Italy =

Geothermal energy in Italy is mainly used for electric power production.

Italy is located above a relatively thin crust, with four large areas of underground heat:

- the first is Tuscany, with the Larderello fields.
- the second is in Campania, the Phlegraean Fields
- the third, very large and not fully explored, in the south of the Tyrrhenian Sea
- the fourth is the Strait of Sicily, around the undersea Empedocles volcano and Lampedusa Island

A 2018 report by the Italian Geothermal Union indicated that Italy has additional geothermal energy potential which has yet to be utilized.

== Exploration ==
Research into the potential for geothermal energy started in 1977, following the oil crisis, with work of ENEL and ENI, which started jointly to bore hundreds of wells in Italy, creating a complete map of the underground resource. But in the '90s, the exploratory activity stopped.

Following results a mapping of Italy in four areas:

- very high potential, with water of more than 150 °C (302 °F) temperature at less than 3 km depth; area extends from NW-SE of Genoa to the Aeolian Islands.
- water temperature between 90 °C (194 °F) and 150 °C (302 °F) at less than 3 km depth.
- water temperature between 30 °C (86 °F) and 60 °C (140 °F) at less than 3 km depth.
- low potential, no commercial utilization at less than 3 km depth.

== Thermal applications ==
Italy uses its lower temperature fluids for spas, agriculture, industry and district heating. A large portion of house heating is concentrated in the Abano spa area, in northeast Italy. As district heating the most important plants are in Ferrara and Vicenza in the eastern Po Valley, about 1990. Smaller district heating plants are found in Bagno di Romagna and Acqui Terme.

== See also ==
- Geothermal power in Italy
- Hydrothermal vent
- Earth's internal heat budget
