= Presenzano Hydroelectric Plant =

- Official name: Domenico Cimarosa Hydroelectric Plant
- Country: Italy
- Location: Presenzano
- Coordinates: 41°22′53″N 14°5′25″E
- Status: Operational
- Construction began: 1979
- Opening date: 1991
- Construction cost: 1,000 billion lire
- Owner(s): ENEL

Upper reservoir
- Creates: Cesima
- Total capacity: 6,000,000 m^{3} (4,900 acre⋅ft)

Lower reservoir
- Creates: Presenzano Lower
- Total capacity: 6,000,000 m^{3} (4,900 acre⋅ft)

Power Station
- Hydraulic head: 495 m (1,624 ft)
- Pump-generators: 4 x 250 MW (340,000 hp) Francis pump-turbine
- Installed capacity: 1,000 MW (1,300,000 hp)
- Annual generation: 1,276 GWh (4,590 TJ)

The Presenzano Hydroelectric Plant, officially known as the Domenico Cimarosa Hydroelectric Plant, is located along the Volturno River in Presenzano, Province of Caserta, Italy. Using the pumped-storage hydroelectric method, it has an installed capacity of 1,000 megawatts (1,300,000 hp). Construction began in 1979, it was finished in 1990 and the generators commissioned in 1991. In 2004, the plant was renamed after Domenico Cimarosa. Power is generated by releasing water from the upper Cesima reservoir down to the power plant which contains four reversible 250 MW Francis pump-turbine-generators. After power production, the water is sent to the lower reservoir. During periods of low energy demand, the same pump-generators pump water from the lower reservoir back to the upper where it becomes stored energy. Power generation occurs when energy demand is high. The upper reservoir, formed by an embankment dam, is located at an elevation of 643 metres (2,110 ft) in the municipality of Sesto Campano in the Province of Isernia. Both the upper and lower reservoirs have an active (or usable) storage capacity of 6,000,000 cubic metres (4,900 acre⋅ft). The difference in elevation between both the upper and lower affords a hydraulic head of 495 metres (1,624 ft).

== See also ==
- Hydroelectricity in Italy
- List of pumped-storage hydroelectric power stations
