= Hydroelectricity in Italy =

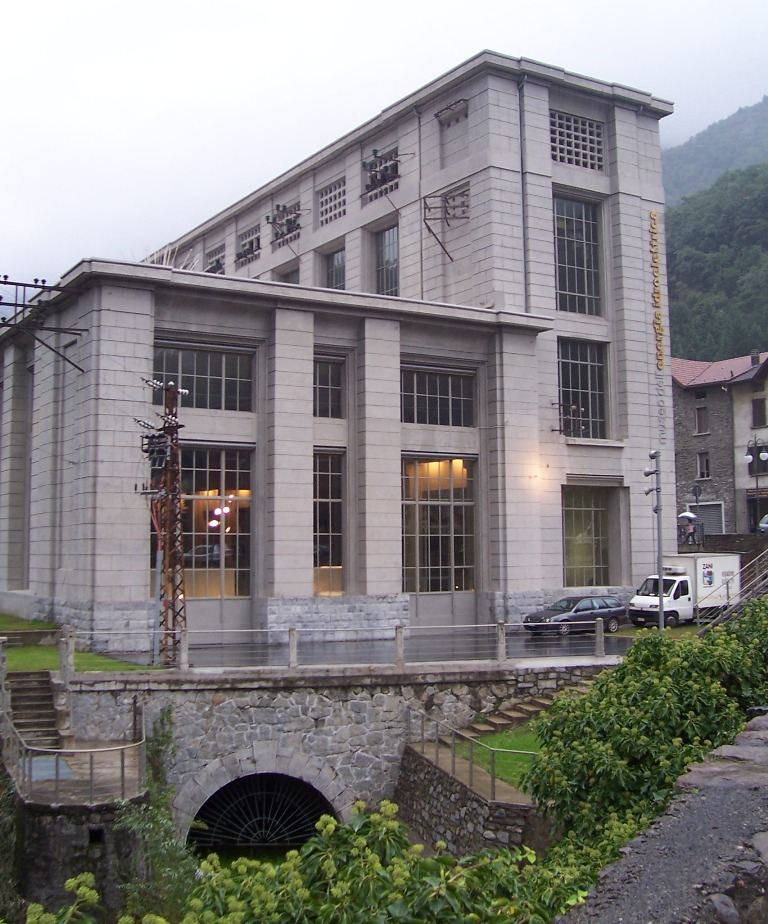
Old hydroelectric plant, now a museum, in Cedegolo, Val Camonica

Italy is the world's 14th largest producer of hydroelectric power, with a total of 50,582 GWh produced in 2010. Electric energy from hydro accounted for about 18% of the national electricity production in 2010.

There were a total of 2,729 active plants in 2010, of which 302 had a capacity greater than 10 MW. Hydroelectric plants are especially widespread in the north, where there are many rivers and mountains. Lombardy, Piedmont and Trentino-Alto Adige contributed for almost 60% of the total energy production in 2010.

Hydroelectricity played a major role in the development of energy sector in Italy, since until the 1950s almost all the electric energy produced in the country came from this source. In fact, almost all the current capacity was installed in the first half of the twentieth century.

Plants in Italy are also used to store excess energy from other sources during off-peak periods.

== History ==
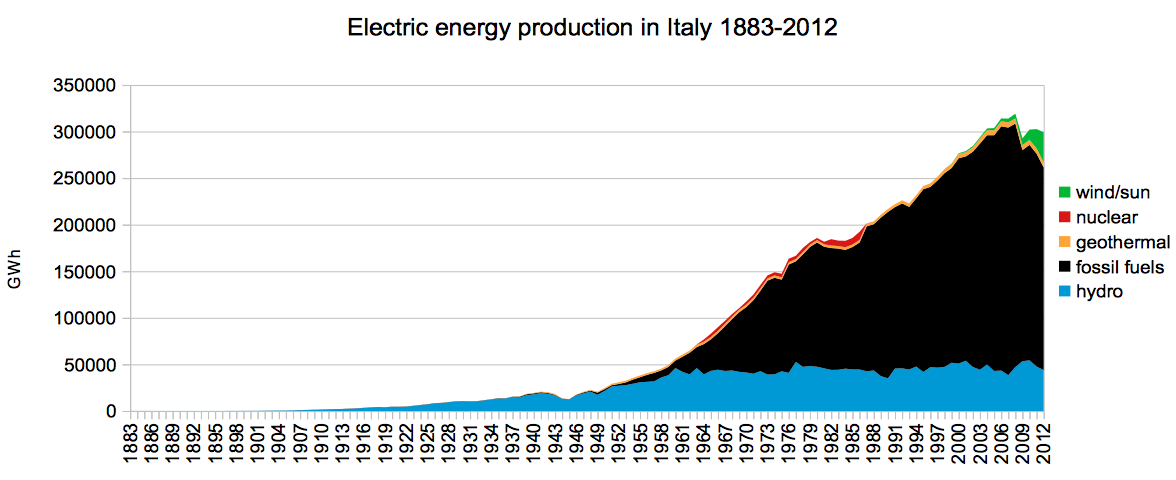
Electric power production in Italy from 1883 to 2012: hydroelectricity (in blue) remained almost the same since the 1950s.

Since the Italian Peninsula is relatively recent geological formation, it lacks commercial coal deposits and oil, so hydroelectricity was the first source widely used in Italy to produce electric energy, and remained the main source at least until the 1960s. For example, of the total 15.5 TWh produced in 1938, hydro accounted for 14.6, or 94%. Hydroelectric energy played a main role in the Italian industrialization since late 19th century. Hydroelectricity contributed about 87.5% of the total energy produced from 1900 to 1960.

Since the 1960s the share of hydroelectricity decreased constantly due to the increase in energy needs and almost unchanged total capacity. By 1980, the share of hydro was already below 25%. The majority of energy was at that time produced by fossil fuels. For comparison, energy consumed in Italy in 2010 was about 20 times that of 1938.

Italian hydroelectric potential is estimated to be exploited at 90%. This explain the almost unchanged total capacity in last 50 years. All the favorable places have already been taken: this poses a limit on the construction of new plants of relevant capacity in terms of technical, economical and environmental problems.

== Largest hydropower plants ==
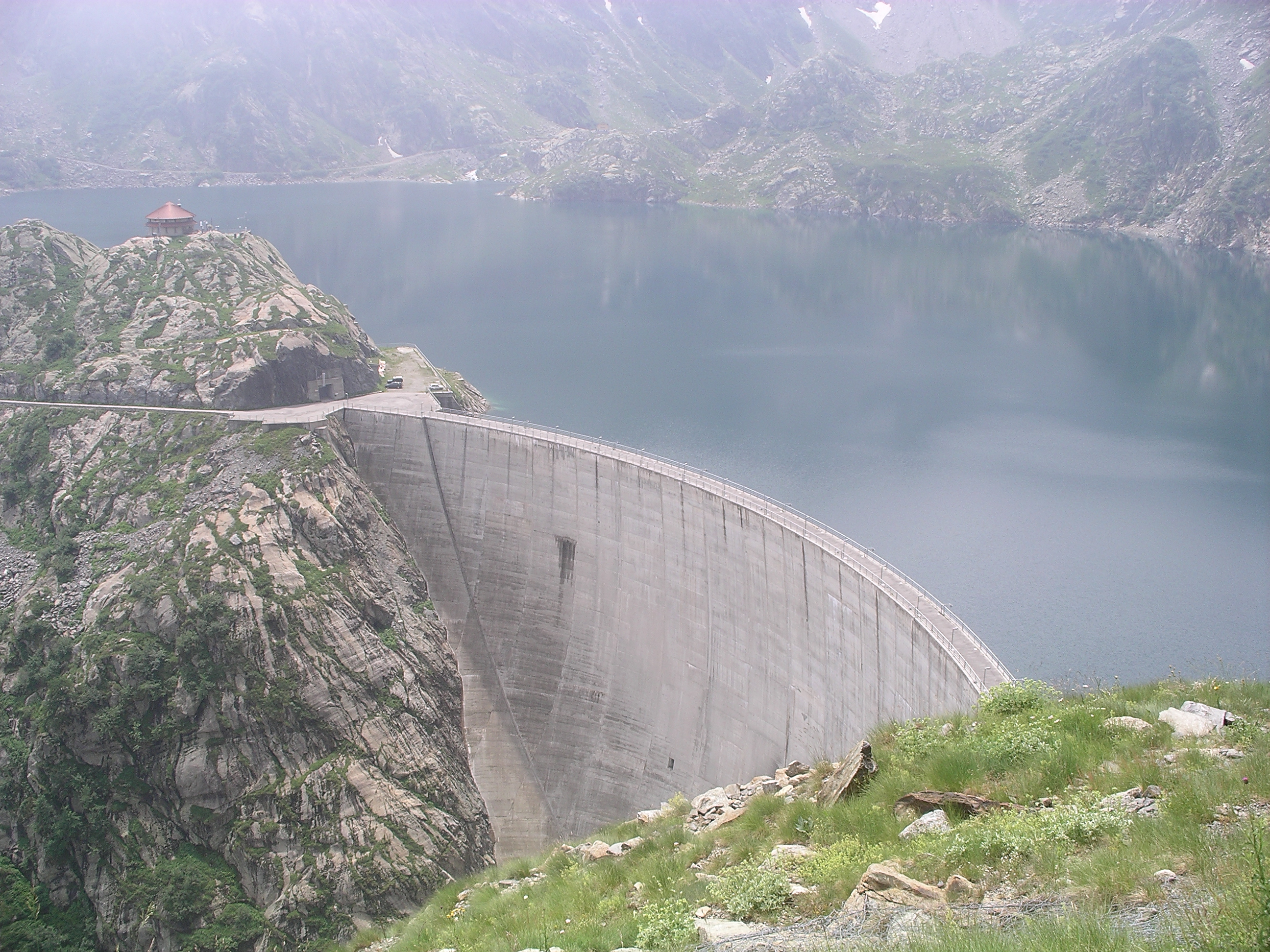
Chiotas Dam at Entracque

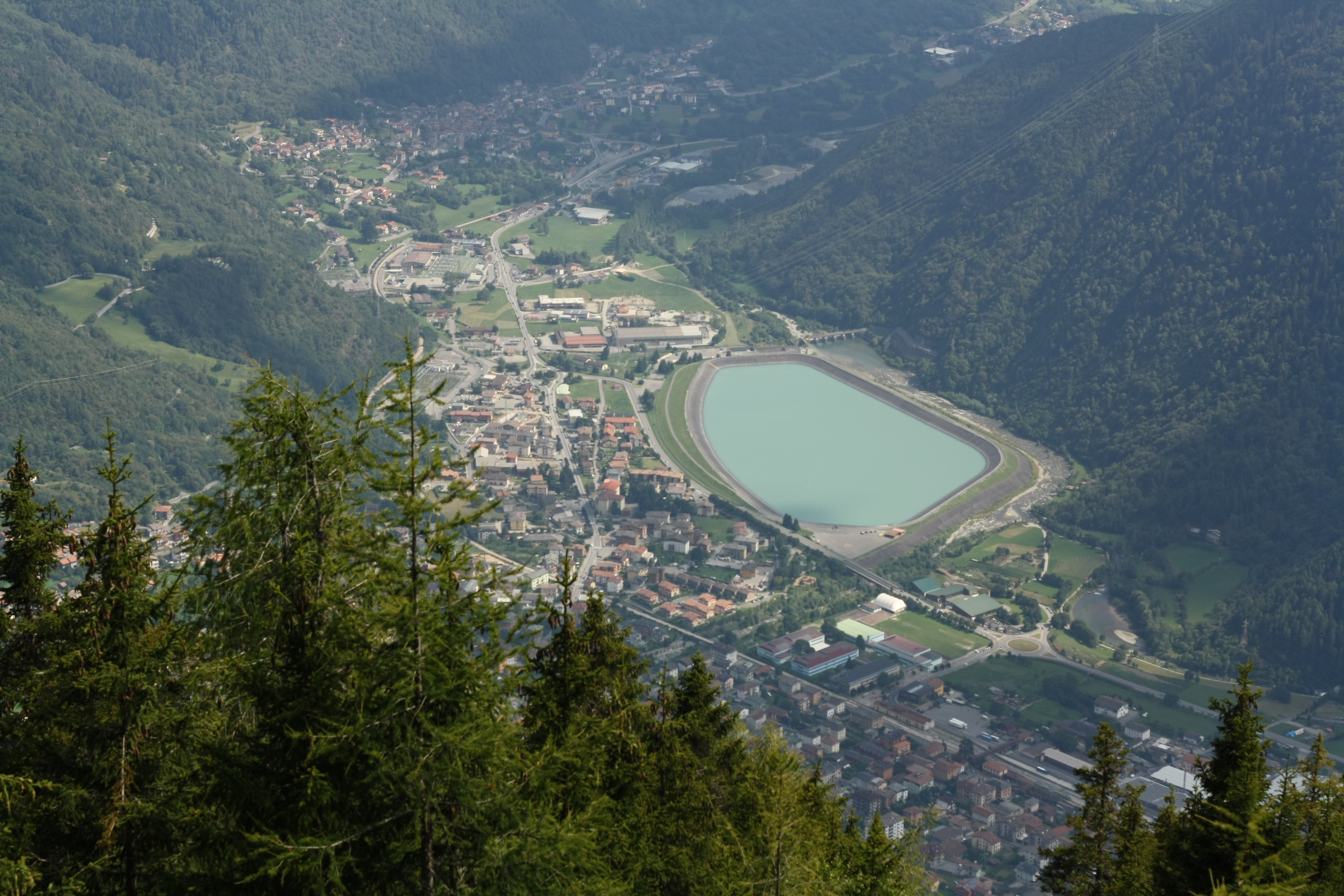
The lower reservoir of Edolo pumped storage plant

Top ten hydroelectric plants in Italy by capacity
Company	Plant	Capacity (MW)	Place	Province	Type
Enel	Entracque	1,317	Entracque	CN	Pumped-storage
Enel	Roncovalgrande	1,016	Maccagno	VA	Pumped-storage
Enel	Domenico Cimarosa (Presenzano)	1,000	Presenzano	CE	Pumped-storage
Enel	Centrale di Edolo	1,000	Edolo	BS	Pumped-storage
Enel	Centrale idroelettrica di San Fiorano	568	Sellero	BS	Conventional+Pumped-storage
Endesa Italia	Centrale di Galleto	530	Terni	TR	
Enel	Centrale idroelettrica di San Giacomo	448	Fano Adriano	TE	Conventional+Pumped-storage
A2A	Centrale idroelettrica di Grosio	428	Grosio	SO	Conventional
Edipower	Nucleo di Mese - C.le Mese	377	Mese	SO	
Edipower	Nucleo di Udine - C.le di Somplago	309	Cavazzo Carnico	UD	
A2A	Centrale idroelettrica di Premadio	245	Premadio	SO	

== See also ==
- Renewable energy in Italy
- Electricity sector in Italy
- List of power stations in Italy
- Vajont Dam
- Geothermal power in Italy
- Solar power in Italy
- Wind power in Italy
- Biofuel in Italy
