= Val'd Agri oil field =

Oil field in Southern Apennines, Italy

Val d'Agri
- Country: Italy
- Region: Southern Apennines
- Location: Southern Apennines
- Offshore/onshore: onshore
- Operator: Eni

Field history
- Discovery: 1991
- Start of development: 1991
- Start of production: 1996

Production
- Current production of oil: 85,000 barrels per day (~4.2×10^{6} t/a)
- Estimated oil in place: 68 million tonnes (~ 80×10^{6} m^{3} or 500 million bbl)

The Val d'Agri oil field is an oil field located in the region of the Southern Apennines. It was discovered in 1991 and developed by Eni. It began production in 1996 and produces oil. The total proven reserves of the Val'd Agri oil field are around 500 million barrels (68 million tonnes), and production is centered on 85,000 barrels per day (13,500 m^{3}/d).

Eni is the operator in Basilicata of the Val d’Agri permit (60.77% owned by Eni), which in 2008 produced 95,000 bbl/d (15,100 m^{3}/d) equivalent (58,000 bbl (9,200 m^{3}) equivalent net to Eni).
