= Italian Power Exchange =

The Italian Power Exchange (IPEX), managed by Gestore del Mercato Elettrico (GME in Italian), is the exchange for electricity and natural gas spot trading in Italy.

== History ==
It was established by the Italian legislature on 16 March 1999 and issued general rules on 8 May 2001.

== Markets ==
IPEX comprises the following spot markets:

- Day Ahead (In Italian Mercato del Giorno Prima, MGP)
- Intra Day (In Italian Mercato Infragiornaliero, MI), which since 10 February 2015 is composed of seven sessions (MI1 to MI7).

== See also ==
- European Energy Exchange (EEX) in Germany
- Powernext in France
