= SOGIN =

Italian nuclear decommissioning company

SOGIN S.p.A.
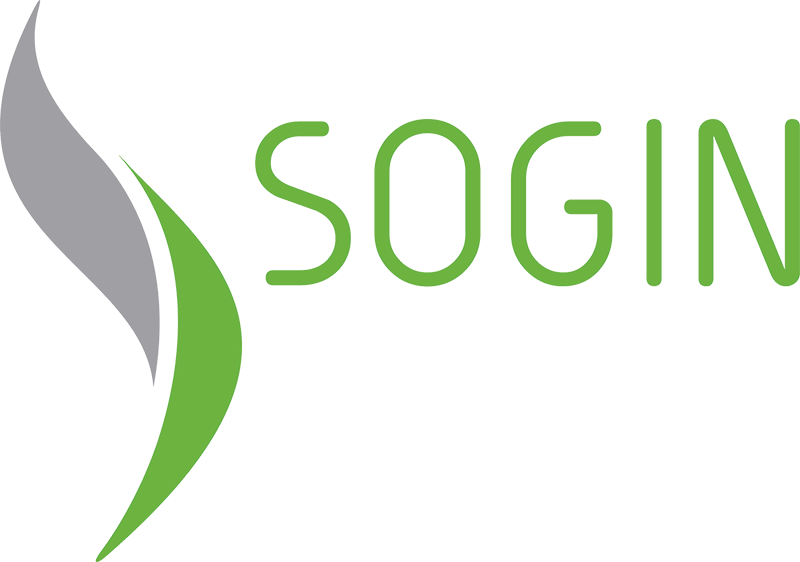

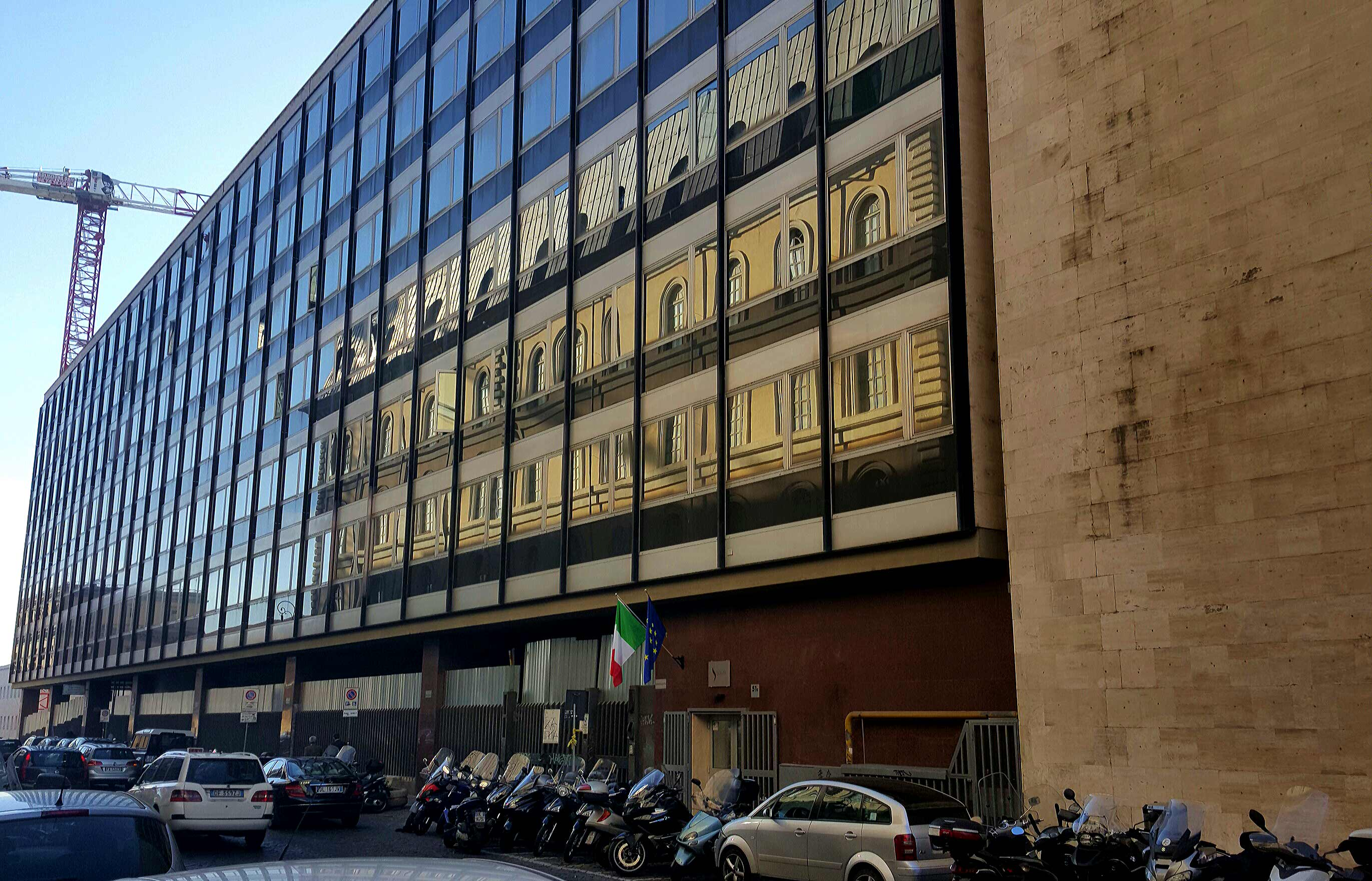
- SOGIN HQ
- Native name: Società Gestione Impianti Nucleari
- Type: State-owned company
- Industry: Energy
- Founded: November 1, 1999; 26 years ago in Rome, Italy
- Headquarters: Via Marsala, 51/c, Rome, Italy
- Area served: Italy
- Key people: Carlo Massagli (Chairman), Gian Luca Artizzu (CEO)
- Services: Nuclear decommissioning
- Revenue: ▲€196.2 million (2020)
- Net income: ▲€7.1 million (2020)
- Total assets: ▲€226.0 million (2020)
- Number of employees: ▲1,158 (2020)
- Website: www.sogin.it/en/

SOGIN (Italian: Società Gestione Impianti Nucleari, the Nuclear Plant Management Company, which is also called Sogin) is an Italian state-owned enterprise responsible for nuclear decommissioning as well as management and disposal of radioactive waste produced by industrial, research and medical processes. Founded in 1999 following the 1987 Italian referendums on nuclear power, SOGIN was originally part of state owned ENEL but became independent, but still government owned, in 2000. The company initially took over the Caorso, Enrico Fermi, Garigliano and Latina nuclear power plants, later adding other sites including ENEA's EUREX. The company has commenced the decommissioning of all the plants and is predicted to complete the work in 2036. The company has been involved in environmental remediation, radioactive waste management and nuclear safety work in Armenia, Bulgaria, China, Czech Republic, France, Kazakhstan, Lithuania, Romania, Russia, Slovakia and Ukraine. SOGIN also undertakes other decontamination work and in 2005 started to help to decommission nuclear submarines of the Russian Navy.

== History ==
Following the 1987 referendums on nuclear power, the Italian government was required to decommission the country's remaining nuclear plants. SOGIN was conceived as the company to undertake this work. SOGIN was created on 1 November 1999 and took ownership of the closed Caorso, Enrico Fermi, Garigliano, Latina nuclear power plants from the state-owned electricity company, ENEL. Initially, SOGIN was created as a part of the ENEL group, but, following the passing of Legislative Decree no. 79, the so-called Bersani decree of 16 March 1999, which marked the beginning of the liberalization of the Italian electricity sector, it was decided to split the group. On 3 November 2000, the SOGIN shares were transferred to the Ministry of Economy and Finance. In 2003, SOGIN also took responsibility decommissioning ENEA sites like EUREX, the OPEC research reactors in Cesano, and the ITREC plant in Rotondella.

On 16 September 2004 SOGIN became a corporate group with the acquisition of 60% of the shares in Nucleco SpA (the remaining 40% being owned by ENEA). In 2005, SOGIN acquired the nuclear enrichment plant at Bosco Marengo, and, in 2012, the company started a three-year programme to decontaminate the boxes that had been used to store plutonium-contaminated gloves up to 1986. SOGIN launched the Observatory for the Closure of the Nuclear Cycle (Osservatorio per la Chiusura del Ciclo Nucleare) with the Fondazione per lo Sviluppo Sostenibile (Foundation for Sustainable Development) in 2014 as an independent monitor of the social, environmental and technical aspects of nuclear sites. SOGIN was originally tasked to completely decommission the Italian nuclear plants by 2019, but it is likely to be 2036 before the task is complete.

== Decommissioning activity ==
SOGIN is responsible for decommissioning four nuclear power plants, located in Caorso, Garigliano, Latina and Trino, as well as the operations in Bosco Marengo, Casaccia, Rotondella and Saluggia. The process, agreed in 2001, involves the systematic decontamination and deconstruction of the site with the aim that the area can be returned to normal use. Work initially starts with a pre-decommissioning stage, carried out under a protective storage license, where the plant stops operation but is no action is taken to dismantle the plant. When SOGIN took responsibility for Garigliano, the plant, which had not operated since 1982, was nearing completion of this stage. The seven sites under SOGIN's control have all gone through this stage in the process.

After SOGIN has completed this task, the site is decontaminated and deconstructed. As well as radioactive material, other hazardous wastes need to be carefully handled, including asbestos insulation. This can take a long time; for example, at Garigliano, the removal of asbestos from the turbine building was complete by 2007 and yet the full decontamination of the reactor building was not complete until 2010. Only once it has been decontaminated can material safely be removed. Once this stage is complete, SOGIN requests a government license to dismantle the whole site. Full decommissioning then follows, including the removal of all buildings, and the ground is decontaminated. In all, over one million tonnes of material is expected to be recovered from the decommissioning process, of which 95% is non-radioactive.

This process can take decades, with estimates for the total decommissioning time varying from 27 years for Garigliano to 32 years for Caorso and Trino. Costs are similarly high, with the total bill for Garigliano expected to reach $432.4 million by the time the site is handed over. The fuel enrichment site at Bosco Marengo was the first to start decommissioning. The process started in 2008 and was completed on 31 December 2021. The first nuclear power plant to gain permission to start full decommissioning was at Trino, the decrees being granted a decree by the Ministry of Economic Development on 2 August 2012. This was followed by a decree authorising the decommissioning of Garigliano on 26 September. Caorso and Latina were granted their licenses in 2014, in January and December respectively.

== Senior management ==
Period	Role and Name	Notes
2023-	President: Carlo Massagli; CEO: Gian Luca Artizzu	
2016–	President: Marco Enrico Ricotti; CEO: Luca Desiata	
2013–2015	President: Giuseppe Zollino; CEO: Riccardo Casale	
2010–2012	President: Giancarlo Aragona; CEO: Giuseppe Nucci	
2009–2010	Commissioner: Francesco Mazzuca; Vice-Commissioner: Giuseppe Nucci, Claudio Nardone	
2007–2009	President: Maurizio Cumo; CEO (2007–2008): Massimo Romano	
2004–2006	President: Carlo Jean; CEO: Giancarlo Bolognini	
2001–2003	President: Maurizio Cumo; CEO: Raffaello De Felice	

== National repository ==
In September 2008, a high-level discussion took place within the Italian government about a central repository for all nuclear waste. This led to, in 2010, SOGIN being given the responsibility for finding a surface site to store nuclear waste. SOGIN projected the repository to be a structure with engineering barriers and natural barriers to store approximately 75,000 cubic metres (2,600,000 cu ft) of low and intermediate level waste permanently, and 15,000 cubic metres (530,000 cu ft) of high level waste temporarily. SOGIN predicted that of this, 60% will come from decommissioned plants. The remainder were to come from scientific research, medical and industrial applications, both waste produced to date and that which was estimated to be generated over the next 50 years. The creation of the repository was a critical requisite for SOGIN to achieve its decommissioning deadline.

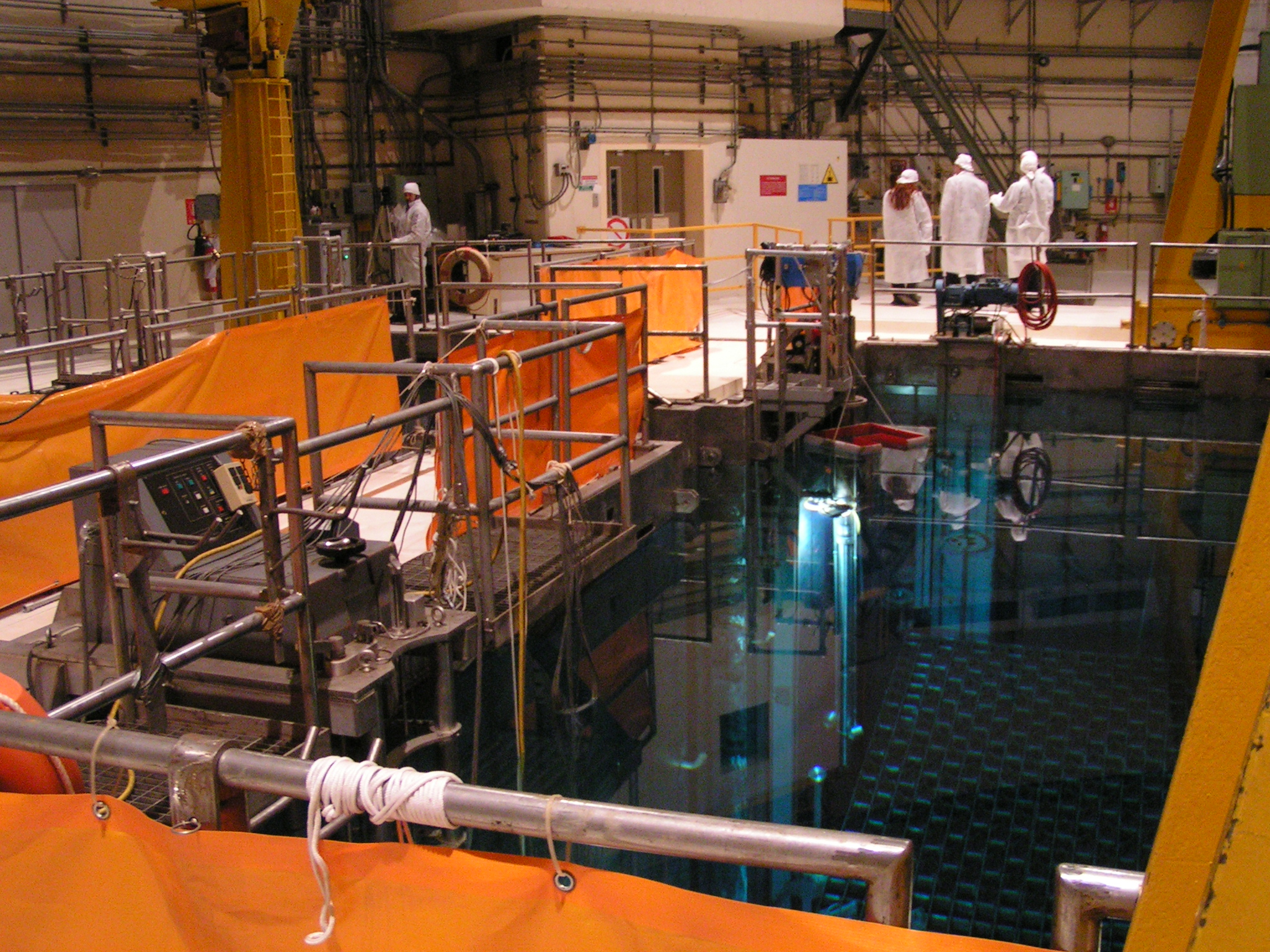
The spent fuel pool at Caorso

The repository was to be hosted in a technology park that also contained research labs which would bring economic benefits to the community, as well as direct payment of compensation administered by SOGIN. Despite this, the search for a repository proved to be difficult. When the first site chosen, the salt mines of Scanzano Jonico, was announced in November 2003, it led to an unprecedented outcry with over 150,000 demonstrating against the decision with residents blocking roads and shutting down businesses. This led directly to the regional council declaring the area a denuclearised zone. Subsequent changes in national legislation have been put in place in an attempt to ensure that any future site can only be agreed by the Council of Ministers after review by a panel of scientists. In 2012, the Italian Parliament passed a law that implied that all nuclear waste would be stored in the repository. However, continued controversy and the lack of progress finding a site has meant that, instead, waste is mainly stored in untreated form at the nuclear facilities themselves. This is also unpopular with neighbouring communities, who fear this will become a permanent solution.

== International activity ==
As a consequence of the difficulty finding a long term solution in the country, waste material has instead been sent abroad, primarily to France and the UK. Initially, up to 2005, shipments were made to BNFL in the UK. in November 2006 the Italian and the French governments agreed to transfer about 235 tonnes (231 long tons; 259 short tons) of spent fuel to France which led to SOGIN signing a contract with Areva in April 2007. The first shipment under this agreement, of fuel from the Caorso nuclear power plant, was completed in June 2010. In 2015, SOGIN signed a similar contract with JAVYS (Jadrová a Vyraďovacia Spoločnosť), the Slovak nuclear decommissioning company, to send 865 tonnes (851 long tons; 953 short tons) of waste to be processed at their site in Jaslovské Bohunice. SOGIN signed an agreement with the Radioactive Waste Repository Authority (RAWRA) in the Czech republic in 2016 covering the storage of nuclear waste, including collaboration to develop a deep geological repository for spent nuclear fuel and high-level waste.

As well as its core business of decommissioning Italian nuclear plants, SOGIN undertakes international consultancy in environmental remediation, radioactive waste management and nuclear safety. The company has undertaken projects at Metsamor in Armenia, Belene and Kozloduy in Bulgaria, Dukovany and Temelin in the Czech Republic, Phénix in France, Aktau in Kazakhstan, Ignalina in Lithuania, Cernavodă in Romania, Beloyarsk, Bilibino, Kalinin and Kola in Russia, Bohunice and Mochovce in Slovakia and Khmelnytskyi and Rivne in Ukraine. SOGIN has been actively involved in the G8 Glocal Partnership programme, launched at the 2002 G8 summit in Kananaskis, to support and accelerate Russia's nuclear disarmament. On 3 August 2005, an agreement was signed between SOGIN and the Ministry of Industry for the company to dismantle Russian nuclear submarines. The programme required a specialist vessel, the Rossita, to be constructed, which was delivered in 2011.

In 2014, SOGIN signed an agreement with China General Nuclear Power Group (CGN) to remove parts from the nuclear fuel pool of a Chinese plant. The contract opened the door to the companies sharing expertise on nuclear decommissioning and collaborating on policies and strategies to manage radioactive waste and used fuel in China. Amongst the first projects is a joint study of an innovative process for the minimization, treatment and conditioning of radioactive waste in Italy.

== Financial performance ==
Period	Revenue	Net profit	Fixed assets	Employees
2005	€121 million	−€1.4 million	€41.5 million	784
2006	€147 million	€0.3 million	€44.7 million	759
2007	€183.1 million	€0.4 million	€43.5 million	829
2008	€400.4 million	€8.6 million	€44.4 million	805
2009	€236.8 million	€7.2 million	€40.3 million	816
2010	€201.5 million	€2.4 million	€37.6 million	820
2011	€245.2 million	€5.7 million	€34.1 million	887
2012	€221.0 million	€3.4 million	€33.1 million	967
2013	€363.0 million	€1.0 million	€33.6 million	991
2014	€211.8 million	€2.9 million	€51.2 million	1,171
2015	€245.2 million	€5.1 million	€78.3 million	1.194
2016	€201.1 million	€4.2 million	€165.7 million	1,171
2017	€192.1 million	€7.8 million	€183.2 million	1,226
2018	€195.8 million	€6.0 million	€214.6 million	1,191
2019	€183.1 million	€1.2 million	€207.1 million	1,148
2020	€196.2 million	€7.1 million	€226.0 million	1,158

== See also ==
- Nuclear power in Italy
- Avogadro RS-1 Plant
