= Fermi Nuclear Power Plant =

Fermi Nuclear Power Plant may refer to:

- Fermi 1, a demonstration-scale breeder reactor, decommissioned in 1975
- Enrico Fermi Nuclear Generating Station, an operating nuclear power plant in Michigan
- Enrico Fermi Nuclear Power Plant (Italy), a now closed nuclear power plant in Italy
