= EUREX =

EUREX (Enriched Uranium Extraction) was a pilot nuclear fuel reprocessing facility built in 1965 by ENEA in Northern Italy. It ceased operation in 1984. It is located near the town of Saluggia on the Saluggia-Crescentino road. Since 2003, the Italian nuclear waste company SOGIN took control to dismantle the old plant.

Environmental remediation of the site is expected to finish in 2029.
