= Garigliano Nuclear Power Plant =

Nuclear power plant in Italia

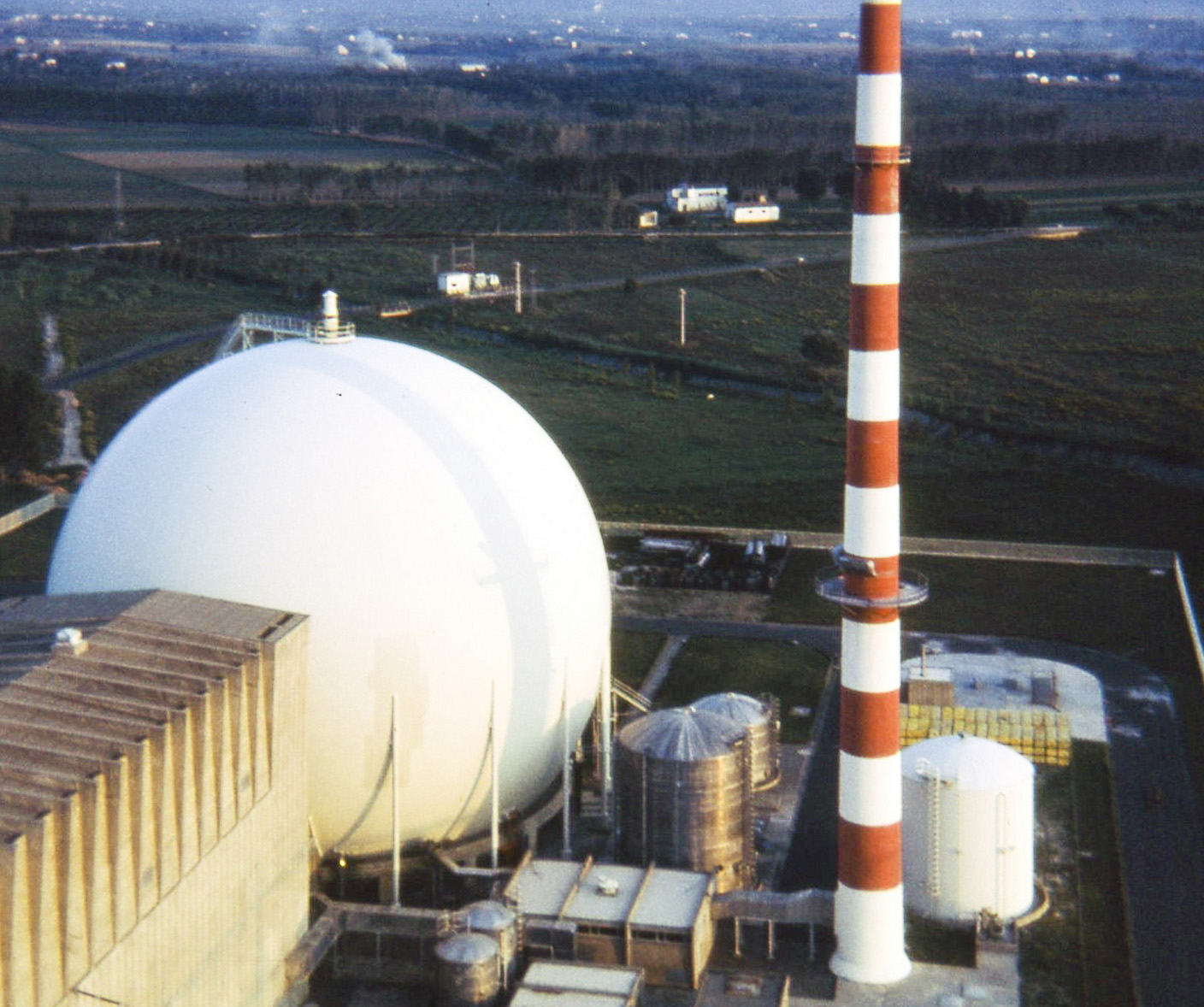
- Garigliano Nuclear Power Plant in 1970
- Country: Italy
- Coordinates: 41.25849°N 13.83492°E
- Status: Being decommissioned
- Commission date: January 1, 1964
- Decommission date: March 1, 1982
- Operator: SOGIN

Nuclear power station
- Reactor type: BWR

Power generation
- Units decommissioned: 1 × 150 MW
- Nameplate capacity: 150 MW

External links
- Commons: Related media on Commons

Garigliano Nuclear Power Plant was a nuclear power plant located at Sessa Aurunca (Campania), in southern Italy. It was named after the river Garigliano.

Consisting of one 150MWe BWR from General Electric, it operated from 1964 until 1982. First criticality was on 5 June 1963, with grid connection 1 January 1964 and full commercial operation from 1 June in that year. Garigliano was in 1964 the fourth BWR ever worldwide commercial operated, and had the second highest MW-capacity after Dresden Nuclear Power Plant unit 1.

Final shutdown was on 1 March 1982 and the plant was handed to the Italian nuclear decommissioning authority SOGIN on 1 November 1999. Decommissioning was expected to take 27 years, with the total bill expected to reach $432.4 million. As of early 2026 the completion of the decommissioning is expected to finish in 2031.

== History ==
The plant was constructed between November 1, 1959, and January 1, 1963, by Società Elettronucleare Nazionale, taking only four years to build.
On 1 June 1964, the plant began production of energy for commercial use. In 1965, ENEL took control of the structure officially.

In 1978, the reactor was shut down and the production of energy ceased. The reactor was officially switched off on 1 March 1982. During its lifetime, the plant had produced 12.5 billion kWh of electric energy. Since 1982 the plant had been in a deferred dismantling state until 1999. In this amount of time the operators had removed all fuel rods from the cooling pool and sent them to be treated.

In 1987, some of the spent fuel rods were sent to Sellafield, Great Britain, to be reprocessed. The remaining fuel rods were kept in storage in Deposito Avogadro and in 2011 were sent to La Hague, France, to be reprocessed also.
In 1999, the property of the plant was transferred to SOGIN, which began to dismantle the plant: the decommissioning is set to end in 2031. Once reached the brown field status in 2031, the sphere and part of the structure will become a museum, in context of industrial archeology.
The radioactive waste will remain on-site for an unknown amount of time until its removal for permanent storage; after its removal the temporary deposits will be demolished, returning the surrounding area to "green field status".

== Decommissioning ==
=== Dismantling of the central chimney (2014-2017) ===
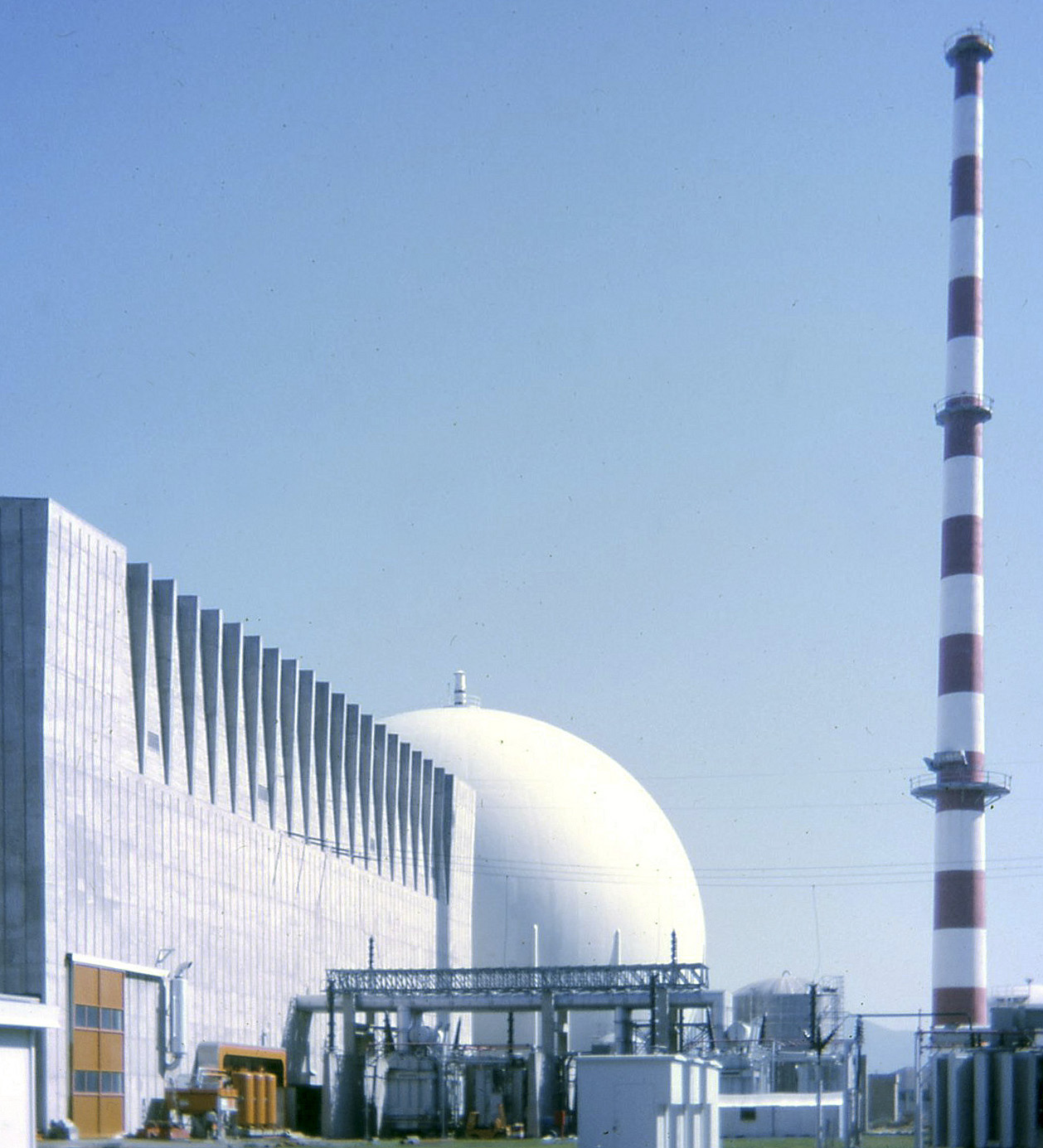
The old chimney in 1970

SOGIN began dismantling the 95-meter-high (312-foot) concrete chimney in March 2014. First, the structure was decontaminated, then it was completely demolished in November 2017. The old chimney has now been replaced with a new 34-meter-high (112-foot) steel chimney.

=== Installation of the new water treatment system (radwaste) (2014-2021) ===
Because of the need to treat liquid waste produced during the dismantling, between 2014 and 2021 SOGIN built a new radwaste to replace the old one which was used during the plant's operating life. In 2023, the new radwaste was used to treat the radioactive mud stored in tanks of the old radwaste system (tanks T12, T13 and T26).

=== Clean-up of trenches (2014-2021) ===
During the late 1960s, the burial of very low-level radioactive waste produced by the plant (such as contaminated protective clothing) was authorized. Three trenches were filled with waste. In 2014, began the remediation of trench 2 and trench 3. In 2017, the reclamation of trench 1 started also. The clean-up ended in 2021. All of the waste was then moved to the temporary deposit named D1.

=== Building a new water supply system (2016-2019) ===
A new shaft and new hydraulic works were built for underground water transportation: water to be used for industrial purposes within the structures.

=== Dismantling of the systems of the turbine hall (2016-2025) ===
In 2016, restoration work was started on the auxiliary systems of the turbine hall, in preparation of the dismantling of the turbine system which is the largest component of the thermal cycle. In 2018, the operations of cutting and removal of the turbine alternator rotor and stator were completed. The rotor was extracted and sectioned then the alternator was removed after being cut and cleaned of any asbestos dust or debris. The dismantling of the turbine was completed in 2025.

=== Dismantling of the water tower (2023-2024) ===
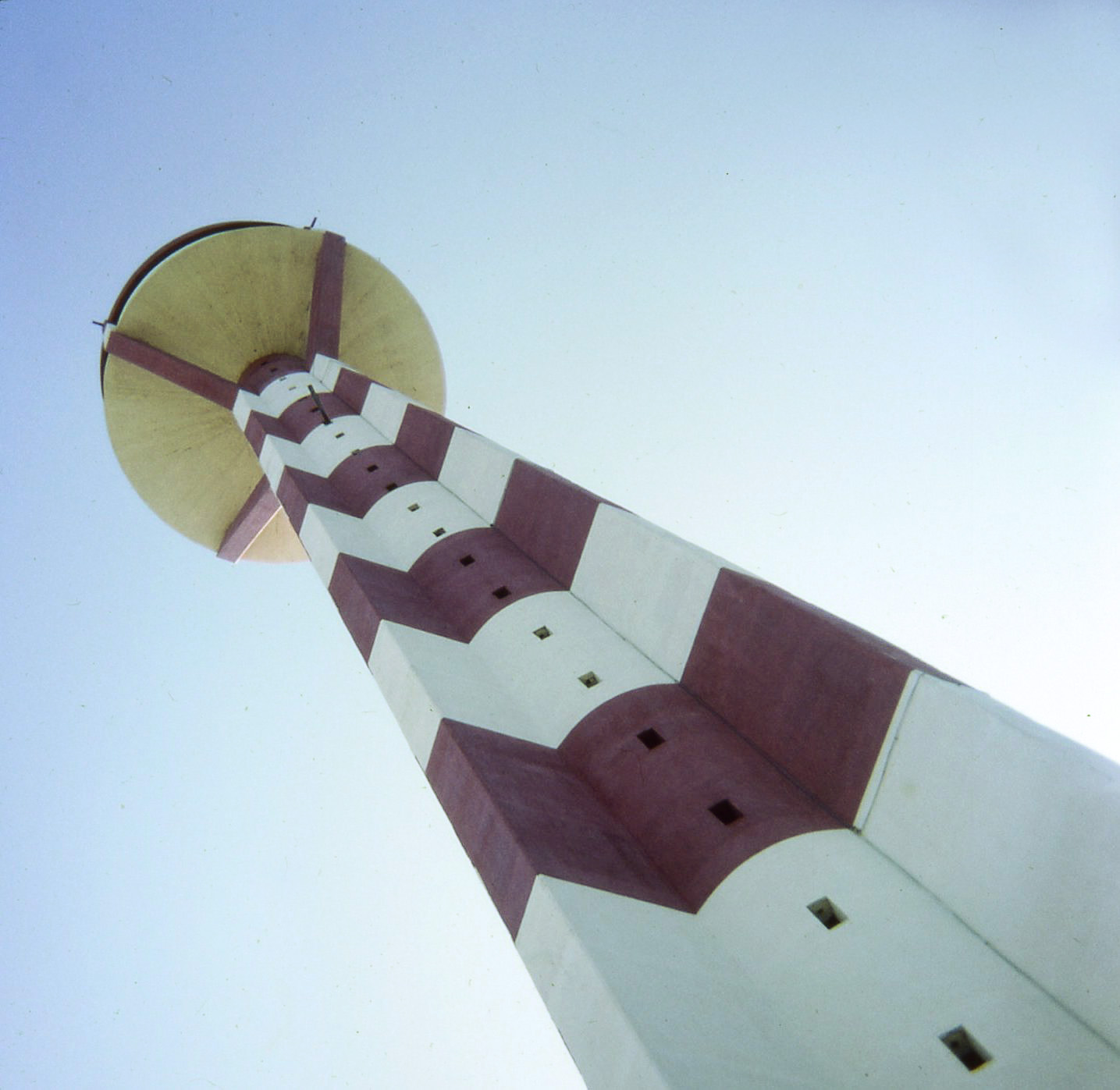
The 72-meter-high (236-foot) water tower in 1970

On October 30, 2023, work began to dismantle the old water tower. The dismantling was completed on February 4, 2024. 1900 metric tons of non-radioactive material (2094 US tons) were produced from the demolition and were later sent to be recycled.

=== Dismantling of the reactor (2023-uncompleted) ===
During the 2000s operations to remove asbestos from the reactor and turbine were carried out. Between 2016 and 2020 activities were carried out to restore the auxiliary systems of the building. The operations of dismantling the reactor proper began in 2023, starting with the dismantling of the vessel head underwater. Still uncompleted, set to end in 2031.

== On-site radioactive waste storage ==
Because of the increasing amount of waste generated due the decommissioning, three on-site deposits, realized between 2007 and 2025, were allocated to the mid-term storage of radioactive waste, waiting for its definitive storage in the National Repository of Radioactive Waste (which hasn't been built yet).

- Temporary deposit ex-diesel: the former emergency building that used to contain the diesel generators of the nuclear plant, now it stores 957 cubic meters of waste. Maximum capacity: 960 cubic meters.
- Temporary deposit D1: it stores 424 cubic meters of waste. Maximum capacity: 1100 cubic meters.
- Temporary deposit D2: it stores 0 cubic meters of waste.Maximum capacity: 1800 cubic meters.

D2 will store the remaining radioactive waste generated exclusively by the decommissioning of the plant.
Some radioactive waste is being kept in steel drums outside the plant, waiting to be stored in the deposits.
The amount of waste kept on storage increases and decreases as more waste is generated and as some waste is taken away to be reprocessed or treated.

Garigliano's total amount of radioactive waste kept on-storage
	Very low-level waste	Low-level waste	Intermediate-level waste	High-level waste
Cubic meters in 2020	1673	1142	90	0
Cubic meters in 2021	1268	1268	85	0
Cubic meters in 2022	1273	1138	85	0
Cubic meters in 2023	1330	1181	85	0
Cubic meters in 2024	1290	1220	88	0

The total amount was 2496 cubic meters in 2022. The amount of waste in 2023 was 2596 cubic meters.
