= 1987 Italian referendums =

Five nationwide popular referendums were held in Italy on 8 November 1987, with three questions about nuclear energy after the Chernobyl disaster, and two questions about justice. Voting day had been postponed by six months, according to the Italian Constitution, because of the snap election of spring.

Turnout was quite high, with 65% of the electors participating in the referendum. For the first time since the adoption of the Constitution in 1948, a referendum was approved by the citizens.

== Nuclear power abrogative referendums ==
The nuclear power referendums concerned three issues:

- abolishing the statutes by which the Inter-ministries Committee for the Economical Programming (CIPE) could decide about the locations for nuclear plants, when the Regions did not do so within the time stipulated by Law 393;
- abolishing rewards for municipalities in whose territories nuclear or coal plants were to be built;
- abolishing the statutes allowing ENEL to take part in international agreements to build and manage nuclear plants.

Some commenters find that the questions were actually too technical for non-experts and were used to obtain popular consent after Chernobyl disaster in 1986.

In each referendum "Yes" won. Subsequently, in 1988 the Italian government commenced to shut down the existing plants. This led to the termination of work on the near-complete Montalto di Castro Nuclear Power Station, and the early closure of Enrico Fermi Nuclear Power Plant and Caorso NPP, both of which closed in 1990. Italy's other nuclear power plants had already closed prior to the decision, Latina NPP in December 1987.

=== Location for nuclear plants ===
Results of the referendum by province. Blue indicates a major in favour; red indicates a majority against.

This referendum asked to abolish the power of the state to oblige the local administrations to accept new nuclear plants in their territory. Italian voters had to say yes if they wanted to support local administrations, or no if they wanted to maintain statal supremacy about this theme. The question had a turnout of 65.1% and a high invalid/blank vote count.

Choice	Votes	%	% of voters	% of registered
✓ Yes	20,984,110	80.6	70.3	45.7
No	5,059,819	19.4	16.9	11.0
Invalid/blank votes	3,818,447	–	12.8	8.3
Total	29,862,376	100	100	65.1
Registered voters/turnout	45,870,931	65.1		

=== Rewards for nuclear plants ===
Results of the referendum by province. Blue indicates a major in favour; red indicates a majority against.

This referendum asked to abolish rewards for local administrations which accepted nuclear, and coal, plants in their territory. Italian voters had to say yes if they wanted to eliminate these payments, or no if they wanted to maintain them. The question had a turnout of 65.1% and a high invalid/blank vote count.

Choice	Votes	%	% of voters	% of registered
✓ Yes	20,618,624	79.7	69.0	44.9
No	5,247,887	20.3	17.6	11.4
Invalid/blank votes	4,005,059	–	13.4	8.7
Total	29,871,570	100	100	65.1
Registered voters/turnout	45,870,931	65.1		

=== ENEL nuclear plants abroad ===
Results of the referendum by province. Blue indicates a major in favour; red indicates a majority against.

This referendum asked to abolish the authorization for ENEL to build nuclear power plants outside Italy. Italian voters had to say yes if they wanted to forbid any worldwide nuclear engagement of Italy, or no if they wanted to continue an Italian nuclear research abroad. The question had a turnout of 65.1% and a high invalid/blank vote count.

Choice	Votes	%	% of voters	% of registered
✓ Yes	18,795,852	71.9	62.9	41.0
No	7,361,666	28.1	24.7	16.0
Invalid/blank votes	3,698,086	–	12.4	8.1
Total	29,855,604	100	100	65.1
Registered voters/turnout	45,870,931	65.1		

== Justice abrogative referendums ==
The justice referendums concerned two issues:

- abolishing the law excluding any type of civil responsibility of judges in event of judicial errors;
- abolishing the special parliamentary board of inquiry which excluded any investigation over ministers by ordinary courts.

Debate about justice was strong in Italy during the 1980s, especially after the case of the unjust arrest of popular TV host and anchorman Enzo Tortora, based only on false accusations by some pentito mafiosi.

The referendums were called by the Radical Party to abolish privileges that nobody had abolished despite the fact that they were in opposition to the text of the Italian Constitution which affirms equality between any citizen. In fact, a sole incumbent minister had been condemned in all republican history: Mario Tanassi for the Lockheed bribery scandals in 1977. The referendum found support by the Italian Socialist Party, which wanted to underline its reformist agenda, and by the Italian Liberal Party.

In each referendum "Yes" won. However, if ministers were definitely subjected to ordinary courts, the Christian Democracy and the Italian Communist Party later approved a law strongly limiting the civil responsibility for judges.

=== Judges' civil responsibility ===
Results of the referendum by province. Blue indicates a major in favour; red indicates a majority against.

This referendum asked to abolish the law excluding any responsibility for judicial errors. Italian voters had to say yes if they wanted to abolish judges' exclusion from civil responsibility, or no if they wanted to maintain it. The referendum had a turnout of 65.1%.

Choice	Votes	%
✓ Yes	20,770,334	80.2
No	5,126,021	19.8
Invalid/blank votes	3,969,894	–
Total	29,866,249	100
Registered voters/turnout	45,870,931	65.1

=== Ministers' board of inquiry ===
Results of the referendum by province. Blue indicates a major in favour; red indicates a majority against.

This referendum asked to abolish the law excluding ministers from ordinary prosecution. Italian voters had to say yes if they wanted to abolish the parliamentary board which substituted ordinary court in ministerial accusations, or no if they wanted to maintain it. The referendum had a turnout of 65.1%.

Choice	Votes	%
✓ Yes	22,117,634	85.0
No	3,890,111	15.0
Invalid/blank votes	3,854,925	–
Total	29,862,670	100
Registered voters/turnout	45,870,931	65.1

== See also ==
- Nuclear power debate
- Referendums in Italy
- Nuclear power in Italy
- Nuclear power in the European Union
- Legambiente
- Anti-nuclear movement
