= Caorso Nuclear Power Plant =

Former power station in Emilia-Romagna, Italy

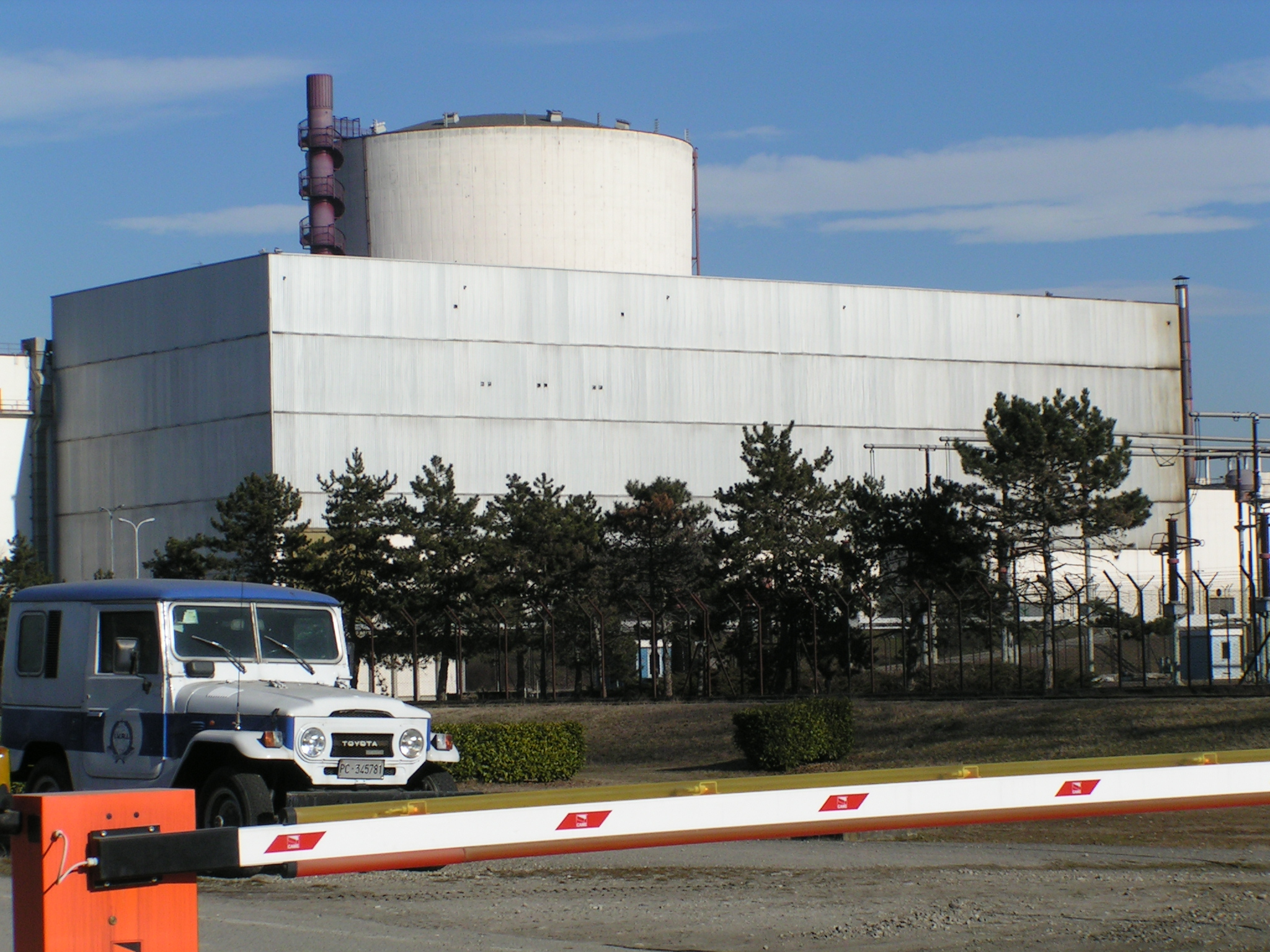
- Outside view of the plant, 2005
- Country: Italy
- Coordinates: 45.07206°N 9.87214°E
- Status: Being decommissioned
- Construction began: 1968–1970
- Commission date: January 1, 1970
- Decommission date: 1990
- Operator: SOGIN

Nuclear power station
- Reactor type: BWR

Power generation
- Units decommissioned: 1 × 860 MW
- Nameplate capacity: 860 MW

External links
- Commons: Related media on Commons

Caorso Nuclear Power Plant was a nuclear power plant at Caorso in Italy. It featured a single Boiling Water Reactor, a BWR 4 with a Mark II-Containment from General Electric, with an electrical net output of 860 MW, used low-enriched uranium as fuel, was moderated and cooled by normal light water.

It operated from 1981 until 1990, when it was closed following the referendum of November 1987. It was by far the most modern and in terms of capacity biggest nuclear power plant to go online in Italy. The Italian nuclear decommissioning agency SOGIN started the process of decommissioning the plant in January 2014.

== Gallery ==
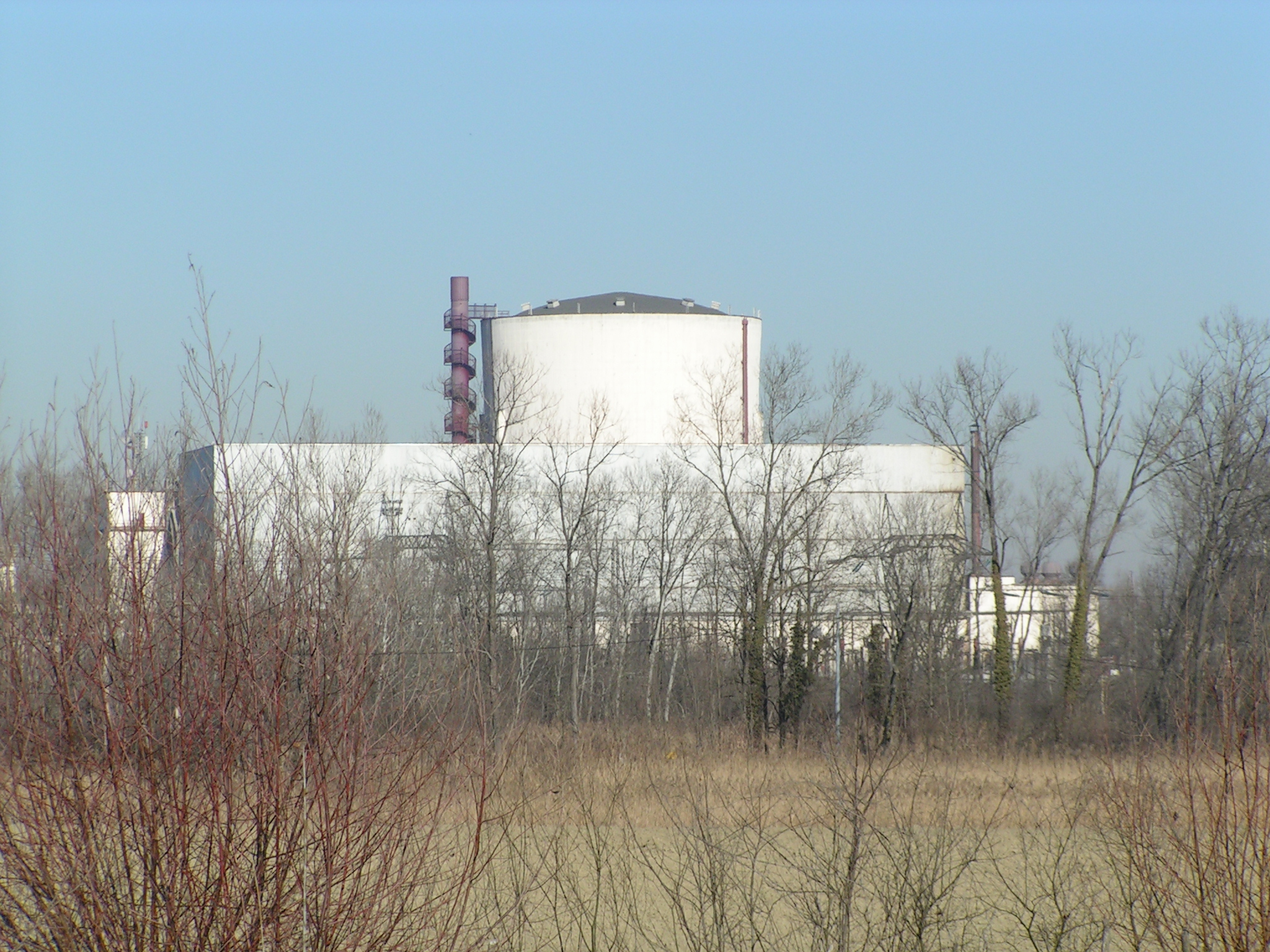
Outside view

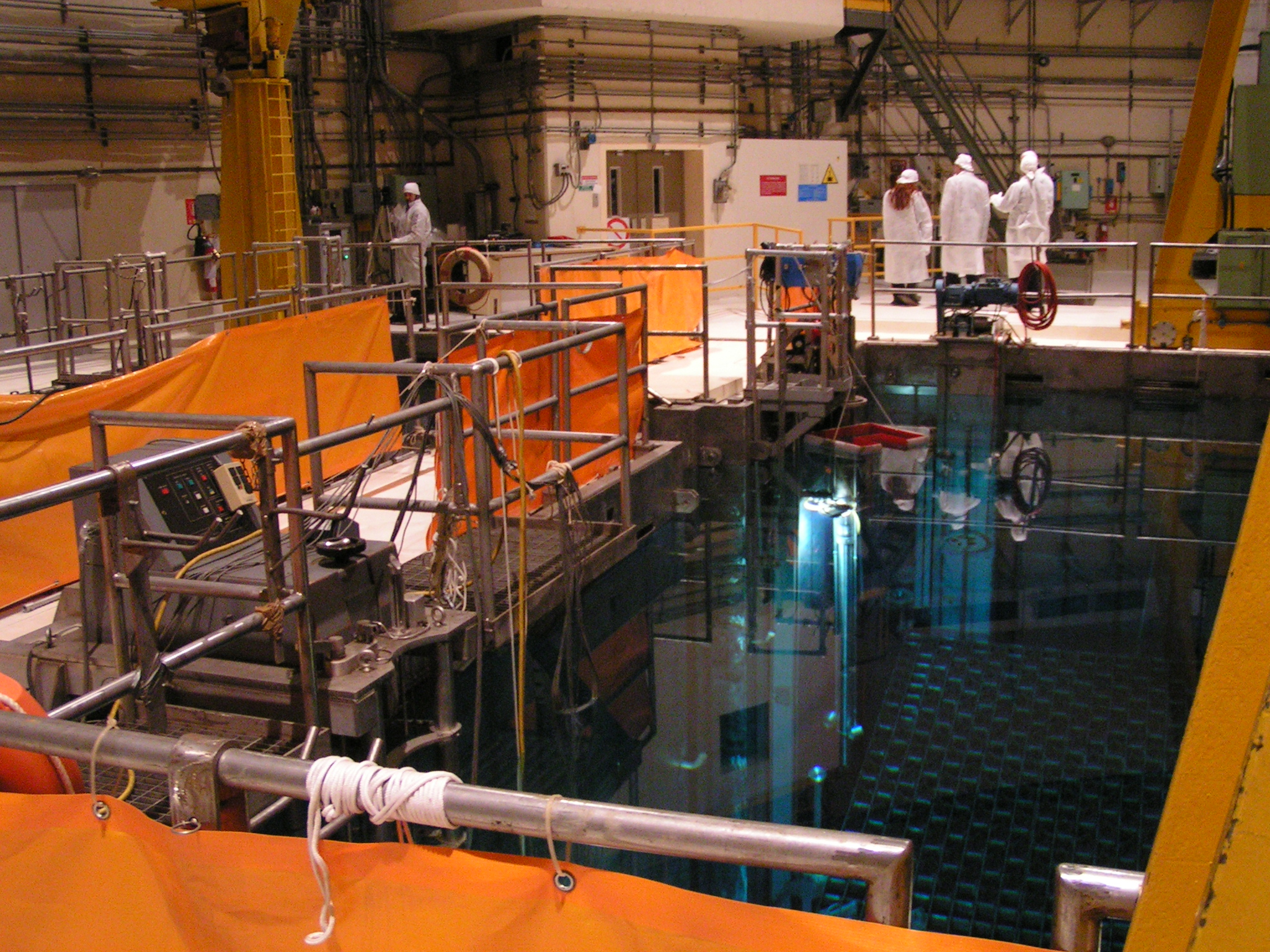
The fuel pool

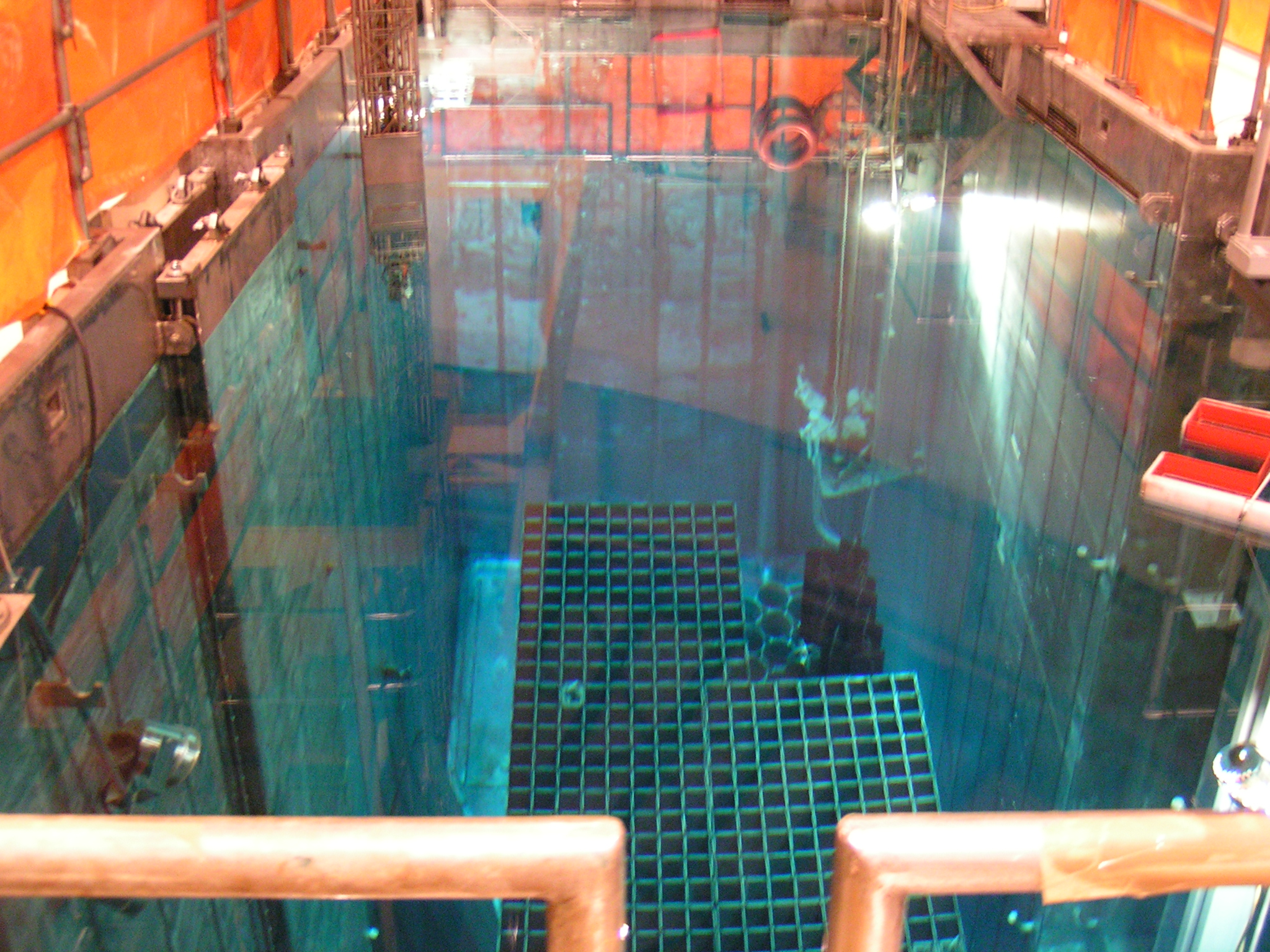
The fuel pool

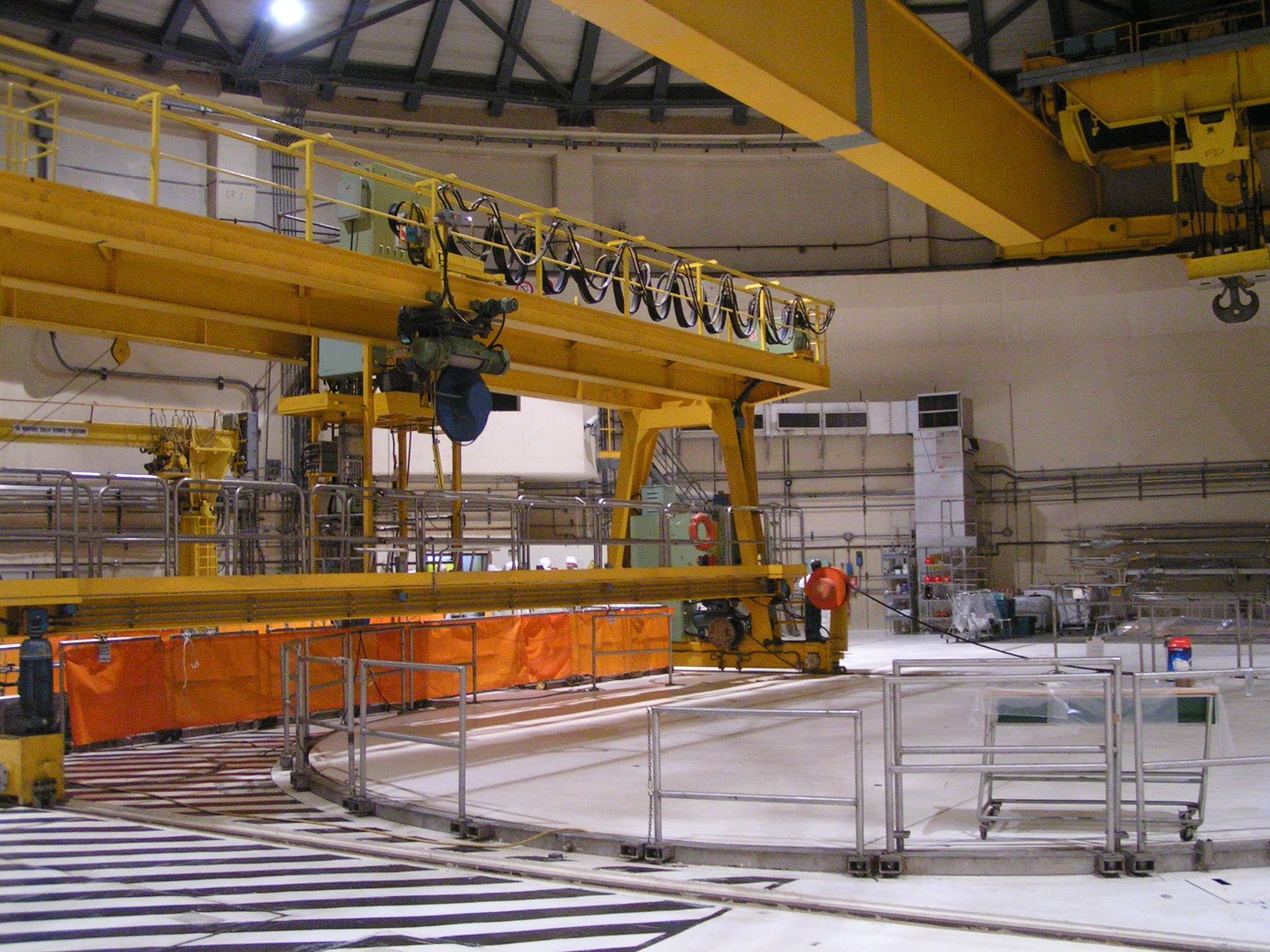
The area above the reactor
