= Enrico Fermi Nuclear Power Plant (Italy) =

Closed nuclear power plant in Italy

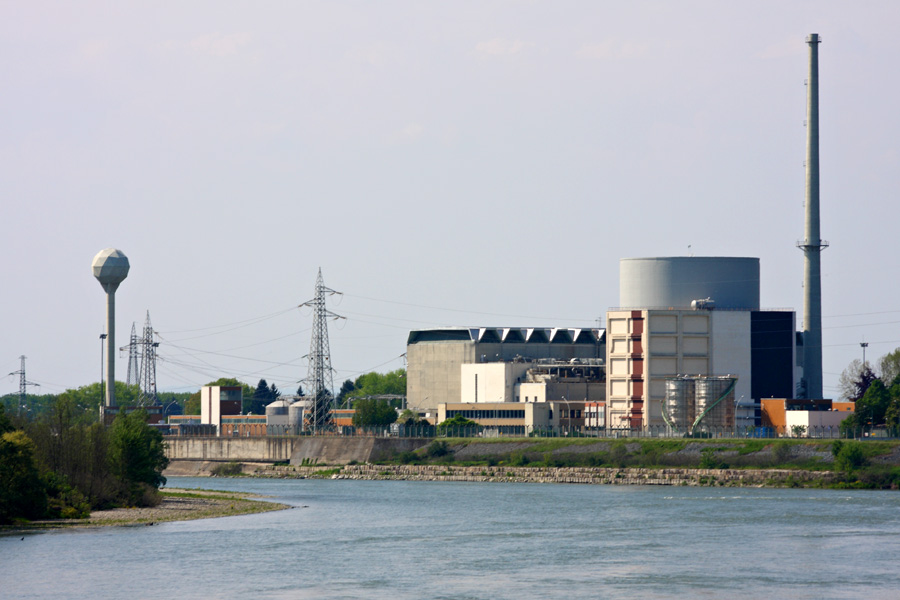
- Country: Italy
- Coordinates: 45°11′02.74″N 8°16′39.20″E
- Status: Being decommissioned
- Commission date: 1964
- Decommission date: 1990
- Operator: SOGIN

Nuclear power station
- Reactor type: PWR

Power generation
- Units decommissioned: 1 × 260 MW
- Nameplate capacity: 260 MW

External links
- Commons: Related media on Commons

Enrico Fermi Nuclear Power Plant was a nuclear power plant at Trino (often referred to as ‘Trino Vercellese’, meaning ‘Trino in the Province of Vercelli’), in north-west Italy.

Consisting of one 260 megawatt pressurized water reactor (PWR) from the vendor Westinghouse Electric Corporation, it operated from 1964 until 1990. Trino was in 1964 the third ever commercially operated PWR worldwide, and it had the second highest megawatt-capacity of them. It was closed down following the Italian nuclear power referendum, 1987.

The experimental enrichment plant, EUREX, near the power plant, was closed down in 1984.
