= Latina Nuclear Power Plant =

Nuclear power plant in Italy

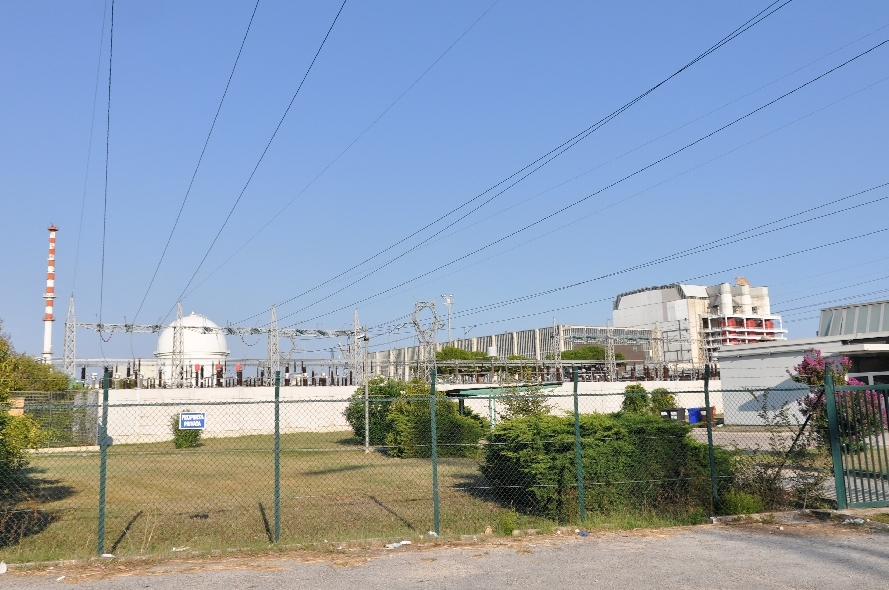
- Latina Nuclear Power Plant
- Country: Italy
- Coordinates: 41°25′33.99″N 12°48′24.701″E
- Status: Being decommissioned
- Construction began: 1958
- Commission date: May 1963
- Decommission date: 1987
- Owners: Enel (1963–1999); SOGIN (1999–Present)
- Operator: SOGIN

Nuclear power station
- Reactor type: Magnox

Power generation
- Make and model: C. A. Parsons and Company
- Units decommissioned: 1 x 160 MWe (Net. 153 MWe) after derating
- Nameplate capacity: 210 MWe

External links
- Commons: Related media on Commons

Latina Nuclear Power Plant is a former nuclear power plant at Latina, Lazio, Italy. Consisting of one 153 MWe Magnox reactor, it operated from 1963 until 1987. A second reactor, the experimental CIRENE design, began construction at Latina in 1972 but it was not completed until 1988 and never operated.

== History ==
The construction of the power station, which was undertaken jointly by SIMEA SpA and the 'Nuclear Power Group' consortium (Backed by AEI, John Thompson, C. A. Parsons and Company, Head Wrightson and A. Reyrolle & Company) started in 1958, as a key component of Italy's nascent nuclear weapons program.

The first criticality occurred in December 1962, and the first connection to the distribution grid in May 1963. Commercial operation took place starting from January 1964.

Originally the station was rated at 210 MWe, making it the largest nuclear power plant in Europe. The danger of significant oxidation of mild steel components by the high temperature carbon dioxide coolant required (in 1969) a reduction in operating temperature from 390 to 360 °C, which reduced power by 24%, down to 160 MWe (Net. 153 MWe).

In 1985 its license was renewed to operate until at least 1992, but after the Chernobyl disaster it was shut down early in 1987 as the result of a referendum. During its activity, the plant produced a total of 26 TWh of electric power.

The Societa Gestione Impianti Nucleari (Sogin) took ownership of the site in November 1999, and has been working on its decommission, which is planned to end in 2027. The dismantlement of the steam generators started in 2024.

== Specification ==
The power station had one Magnox nuclear reactor, supplying steam to three 70 MWe turbo generator sets which were manufactured by C. A. Parsons and Company.

Graphite for the Magnox reactor core was manufactured by Anglo Great Lakes Corporation Ltd under contract from A. Reyrolle & Company, a member company of the 'Nuclear Power Group' consortium.

Three 12-cylinder FIAT B3012ESS 1,500kW diesel generating sets were installed to provide electricity to auxiliary plant, in-case of a Loss Of Offsite Power (LOOP) event.

== See also ==
- Nuclear power in Italy
