= Least of the great powers =

Label for international status of Italy

"Least of the great powers" is a label used to conceptualize Italy's status as a borderline great power. The concept originated with the unification of the country in the late 19th century, when the newly established Kingdom of Italy was invited into the great power system, a promotion from the middle power status of its predecessor Piedmont-Sardinia. However, the Italian military, colonial and industrial output, while too significant to be ignored, could not rival that of the rest of the great powers. In the 21st century, Italy is part of great power concerts such as the EU trio, the NATO Quint, the G7 and various International Contact Groups. Italy is also one of the world's major economies, one of the UN's core financial supporters, the leading nation of the Uniting for Consensus, and leads in shipping services, air transport, and industrial development. Similar terms used by academics to describe Italy's role in global affairs include "awkward great power", "intermittent major power", and "small great power".

== Strengths ==
Italy's great power strength includes a vast advanced economy (in terms of national wealth, net wealth per capita and national GDP), a strong manufacturing industry (ranking 7th on the list of countries by manufacturing output), a large luxury goods market, a large national budget and the third largest gold reserve in the world. It has one of the largest SDRs and Voting Power in the IMF. The country is a cultural superpower and it has close ties with the rest of the Catholic world as the home of the Pope. Italy is a key player in maintaining international security, especially in the wider Mediterranean region, (Note: The concept of Mediterraneo Allargato (Enlarged Mediterranean) includes the Horn of Africa, the Balkans and the MENA region.) by performing air policing duties for its allies and commanding multinational forces in foreign countries. The country has therefore developed considerable military capabilities by building two aircraft carriers and establishing some overseas military bases. The Italian navy was the first to launch an intermediate-range ballistic missile from the sea, an UGM-27 Polaris launched from the cruiser Giuseppe Garibaldi. The country is home to two nuclear bases and, as part of the NATO nuclear sharing program, therefore has a retaliatory nuclear capacity despite nominally being a non-nuclear state. According to the former Italian President Francesco Cossiga, Italy's plans of nuclear retaliation during the Cold War consisted of targeting nuclear weapons in Czechoslovakia and Hungary in case the Soviet Union waged nuclear war against NATO. He acknowledged the presence of U.S. nuclear weapons in Italy, and speculated about the possible presence of British and French nuclear weapons.

Italy secretly developed its own nuclear weapons program, and one in collaboration with France and Germany, but abandoned such projects when it joined the nuclear sharing program. The country has developed the ABM PAAMS system. It has developed several space-launch vehicles such as Alfa and more recently Vega. In more recent years, under the auspices of European Space Agency, it has demonstrated the reentry and landing of a spacecraft, the Intermediate eXperimental Vehicle. Italy is home of one of two ground operations centres of the Galileo global satellite navigation system.

Italy contributes greatly to scientific research and operates some permanent research stations in Antarctica. In terms of spaceflight capability, the country owns the Broglio Space Centre. The country is a major contributor to the European Space Agency and the International Space Station.

Italy is regarded as strong militarily, with the Italian Armed Forces having the 12th-largest budget in the world and 168,000 active military personnel.

== Weaknesses ==
Italy's weakness and structural problems include internal political instability, a large public debt, slow economic and productivity growth, and significant economic drag imposed by the productivity in southern Italy, partially caused by longstanding public corruption, which has required ongoing fiscal support from the more prosperous north, placing a strain on the national budget.

== Overview ==
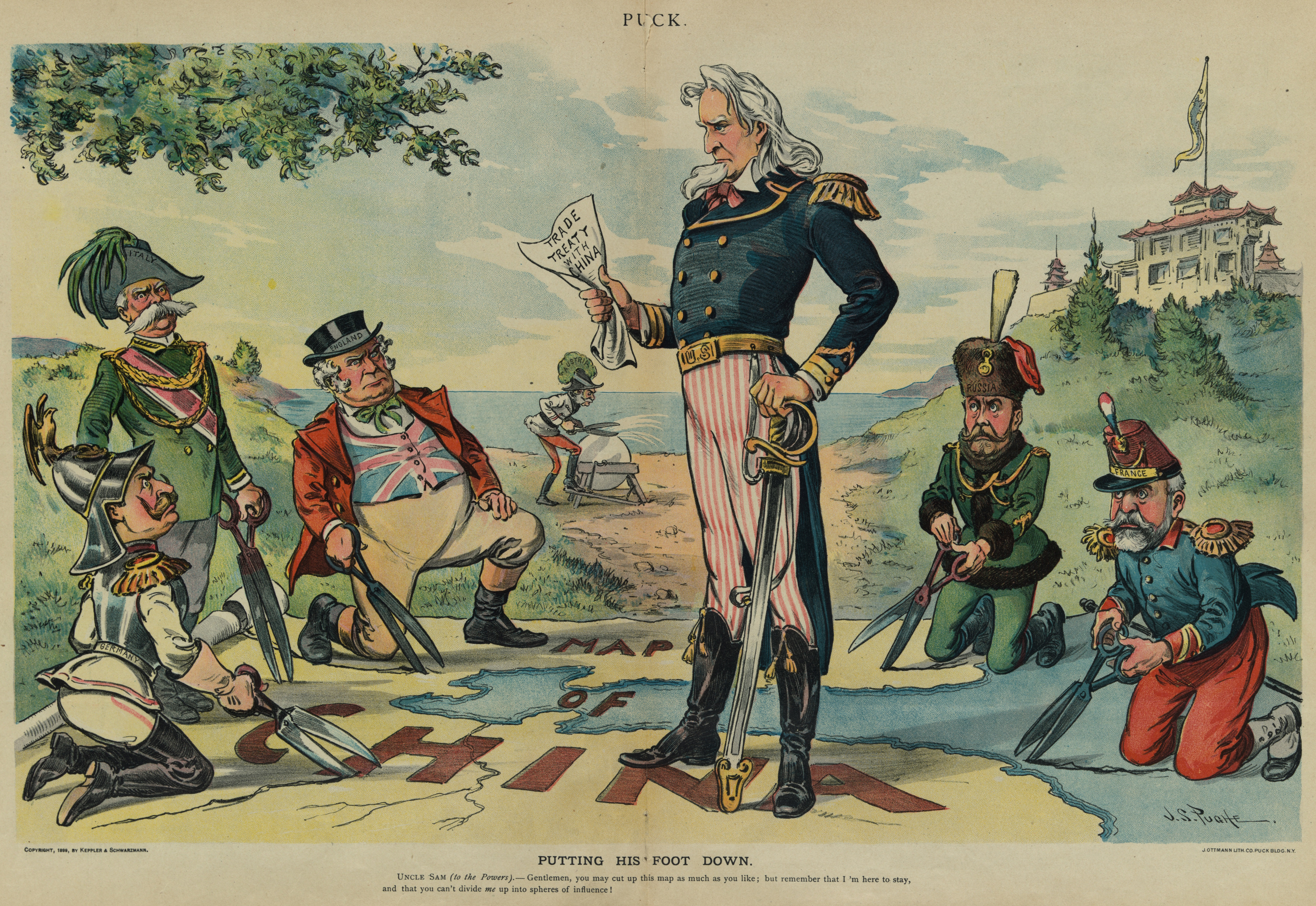
Major powers plan to cut up China for themselves; United States, Germany, Italy, United Kingdom, France, Russia, and Austria-Hungary are represented by Wilhelm II, Umberto I, John Bull, Franz Joseph I (in rear), Uncle Sam, Nicholas II, and Émile Loubet. Punch, Aug. 23, 1899, by J. S. Pughe.

The stages of Italian unification during 1829–1871

Following the Risorgimento, the newly united Italy was recognized as the "sixth great power" by Austria, Prussia, France, Russia and the United Kingdom. Italians achieved unification following a series of wars against Austria and the Kingdom of the Two Sicilies, securing national unification in 1861; Rome became the country's capital in 1871, following the capture of the city a year before. The same year Italy was admitted into the concert of great powers as a signatory of the Treaty of London (1871). In 1882, Italy formed the Triple Alliance with Germany and Austria-Hungary. In the same year, the coastal town of Assab on the Red Sea was taken over by the Italian government, becoming Italy's first overseas territory.

Italy defeated the Ottoman Empire in 1911–1912. By 1914, Italy had acquired Eritrea, a large protectorate in Somalia and administrative authority in formerly Turkish Libya. Outside of Africa, Italy possessed a small concession in Tientsin in China (following the intervention of the Eight-Nation Alliance in the Boxer Rebellion) and the Dodecanese Islands off the coast of Turkey.

Italy took part in World War I against the Central Powers as a principal allied power along with France, the UK and Japan. It defeated the Austrian Empire at Vittorio Veneto in 1918 and became one of the permanent members of the League of Nations' executive council.

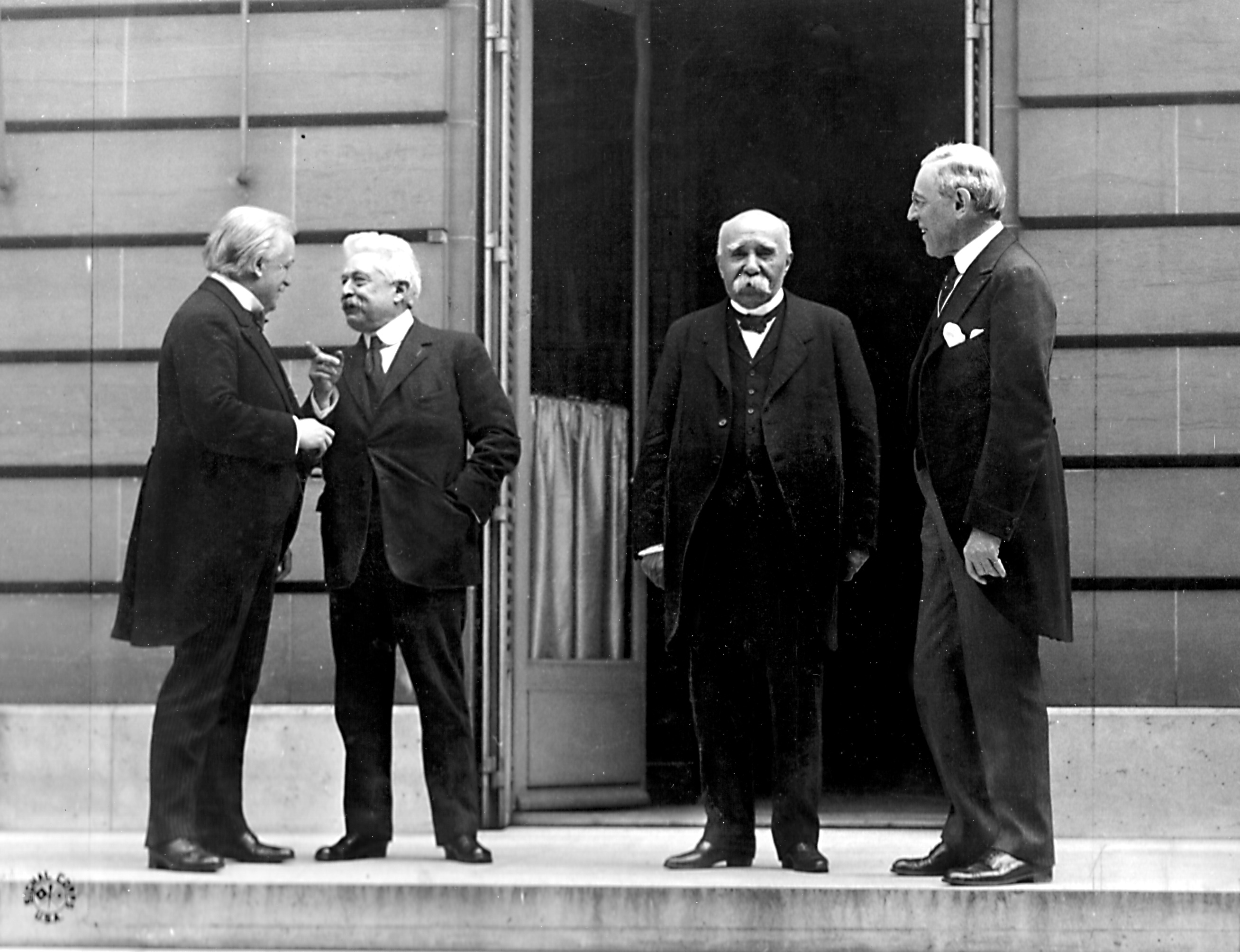
The "Big Four" of the World War I at the Paris Peace Conference of 1919: David Lloyd George, Vittorio Emanuele Orlando, Georges Clemenceau and Woodrow Wilson.

The Fascist government that came to power with Benito Mussolini in 1922 sought to increase the size of the Italian Empire and to satisfy the claims of Italian irredentists. In 1935–36, in its second invasion of Ethiopia Italy was successful and merged its new conquest with its older east African colonies. In 1939, Italy invaded Albania (brought under Italian protection in the previous decades) and incorporated it into the Fascist state. During World War II, Italy fought first as one of the Axis powers along with Germany and Japan (1940-1943) and, following the armistice signed with the Anglo-Americans and the subsequent German invasion with the emergence of the Italian resistance movement, as a co-belligerent of the Allies (1943-1945).

Following the Italian Civil War and the economic depression caused by World War II, Italy enjoyed an economic miracle, promoted European unity, joined NATO and became an active member of the European Union. Italy was granted a United Nations trust territory to administer Somaliland in 1950. When Somalia became independent in 1960, Italy's eight-decade experience with colonialism ended.

For most of the second half of the 20th century, the Christian Democrats dominated the Italian political landscape pursuing a foreign policy aimed at strengthening East–West dialogue. As a consequence of that, Italy decided to build close relations with the Arab world and the USSR despite being part of the free world.

In 1962, Prime Minister Amintore Fanfani favoured the compromise between the US and the Soviet Union during the Cuban Missile Crisis by removing the Jupiter ballistic missiles from Italian soil.

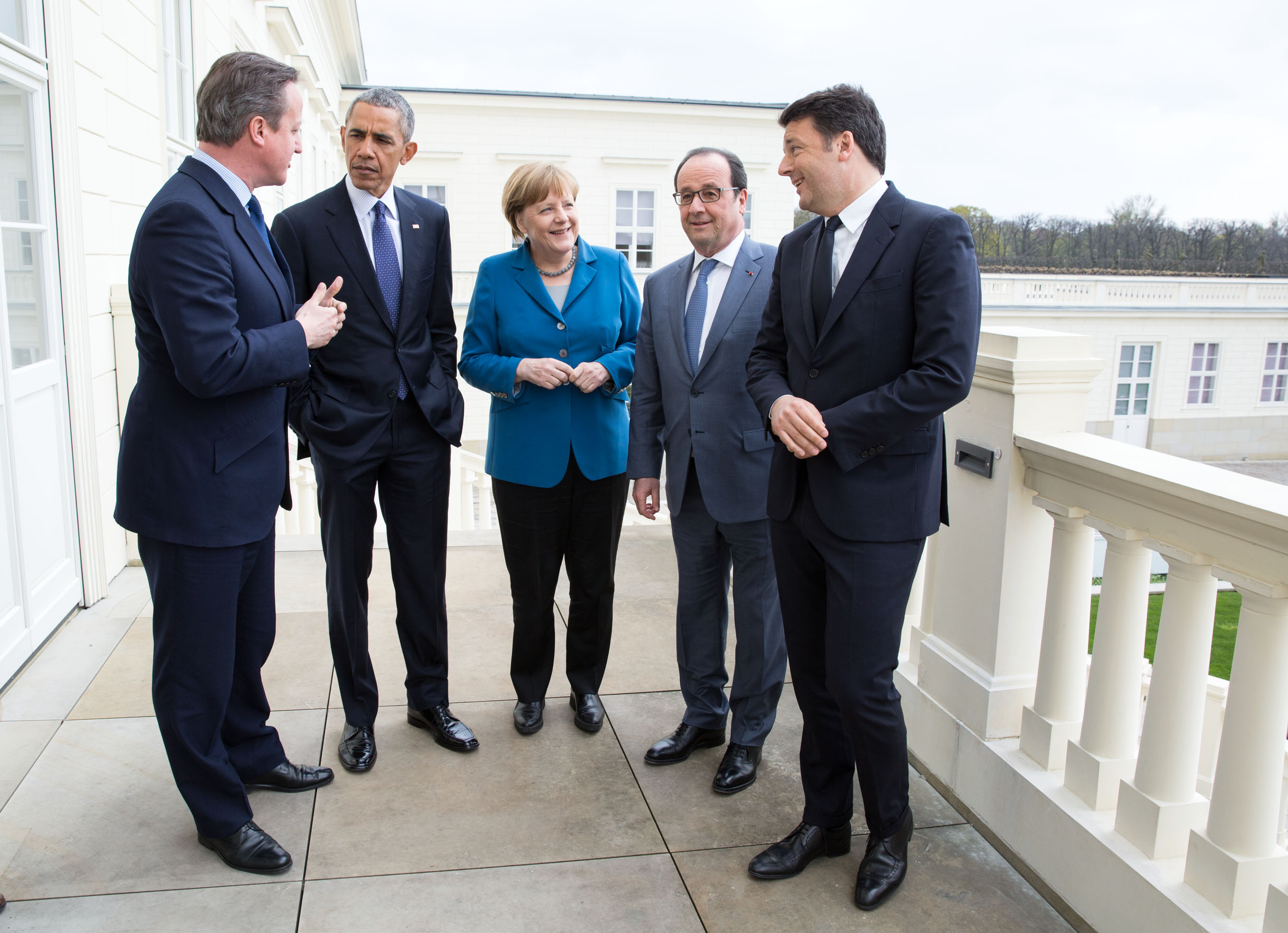
David Cameron, Barack Obama, Angela Merkel, François Hollande and Matteo Renzi. Italy is the least great power of the "Quint".

In the 80s, under the leadership of the socialist Bettino Craxi, Italy acted as an aggressive regional power in the Mediterranean. Craxi warned Gaddafi of the 1986 United States bombing of Libya, allowing him to survive the attack, and ordered the Italian intelligence services to plan a coup d'état in Tunisia supporting the instalment of Zine El Abidine Ben Ali as the new president of the country.

Giulio Andreotti was the last Christian Democrat to serve as Prime Minister between 1989 and 1992. Despite being hostile to German reunification, he became one of the fathers of the Maastricht Treaty along with German Chancellor Helmut Kohl and French President François Mitterrand, often in contrast with Margaret Thatcher.

== See also ==
- Great Power
- Power (international relations)
