= 36th Air Brigade (Italy) =

36th Strategic Interdiction Air Brigade
- 36ª Brigata aerea interdizione strategica
- Ensign of the 36ª Aerobrigata I.S. of the Italian Air Force
- Active: 23 April 1960-21 June 1963
- Country: Italy
- Branch: Italian Air Force
- Type: Air Brigade
- Size: 1265 (1960) - 2443 (1963) troops
- Garrison/HQ: "Antonio Ramirez" Gioia del Colle Air Base, Italy

Commanders
- Notable commanders: Col. Edoardo Medaglia; Gen. B.A.Giulio Cesare Graziani; Gen. B.A. Oreste Genta

The 36th Strategic Interdiction Air Brigade (Italian: 36ª Brigata aerea interdizione strategica) was a short-lived formation of the Italian Air Force, active between 1960 and 1963. The formation was tasked with operating, in conjunction with some USAF units, PGM-19A Jupiter medium-range ballistic missiles.

== History ==
Italian activities in the field of long range missiles started in 1957 with a secret agreement with France and the Germany dealing with military applications of nuclear energy and common development of a 2,500 km range ballistic missile. At the same time, the USA started negotiations with Italy in order to install Jupiter missiles on its soil. The technical arrangement was signed in August 1959 between USA and Italy. The agreement provided that the missiles would be set in motion by the Italian Air Force but that the nuclear warheads would remain under US control.

On 23 April 1960, the 36th Strategic Interdiction Brigade was established by the Italian Air Force, with command in Gioia del Colle Air Base. English language training of Italian personnel was carried out at the Lackland Air Force Base in Texas and then at the Redstone Arsenal in Huntsville, Alabama, for technical and operational aspects. Missiles were transported between April and June 1960. Training lasted from May 1959 to October 1960. The two units of 15 missiles each was put in operational service between February and July 1961. The 36th Air Brigade was deactivated on 1 April 1963 and definitively disestablished on 21 June 1963.

=== Commanders ===
The 36th Air Brigade had three Commanders:

- 1 May 1960 - 8 February 1961: Col. Pilota Edoardo Medaglia;
- 8 February 1961 - 15 September 1962: Gen. B.A. Giulio Cesare Graziani;
- 15 September 1962 - 1 July 1963: Gen. B.A. Oreste Genta.

== Organization ==
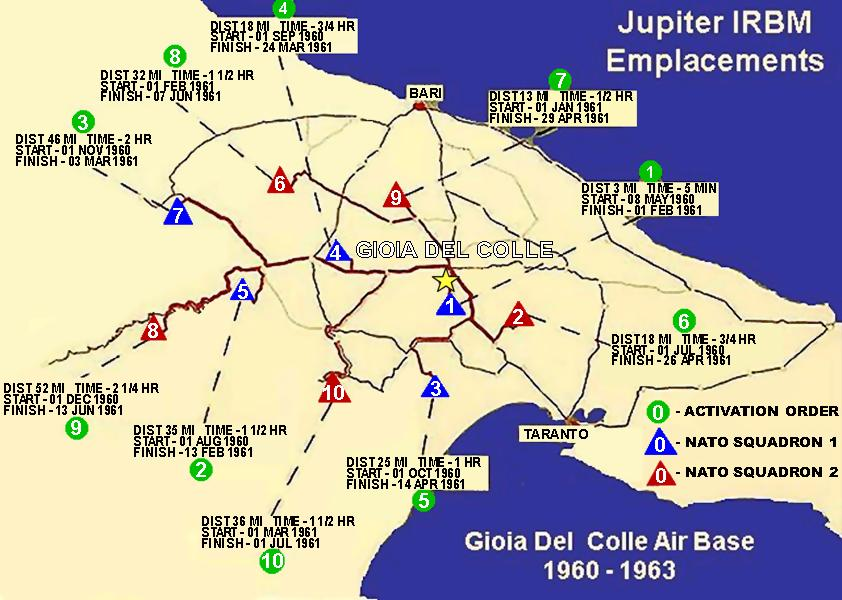
Deployment locations for Jupiter missiles in Italy from 1961 to 1963.

The formation consisted of the 1st IS Unit and the 2nd IS Unit, each of which controlled five launch positions, with a ready-to-use missile and two refills, for a total of thirty shots. The medium-range ballistic missiles in use were the PGM-19A Jupiter, which could carry a Los Alamos/Sandia Mk-49 Mod. 3 thermonuclear warhead of 1.44 Megatons.

The air brigade had its headquarters in Gioia del Colle Air Base; the launch sites (built in a triangular configuration) were within 30 miles, in the direct vicinity of the villages Acquaviva delle Fonti, Altamura (two sites), Gioia del Colle, Gravina in Puglia, Laterza, Mottola, Spinazzola, Irsina and Matera.

=== Launch site organization ===
Each launch site had its own logistic support unit (with the exception of Gioia del Colle) and a garrison of around 130 military personnel, who had the task of periodically performing missile efficiency tests and ensuring the constant weapons readiness. The commander of each Group was a senior officer, typically a major, but sometimes a lieutenant colonel or, in one instance, by a captain.

Each weapon system was installed on 20 vehicles. This fleet included two vehicles with generator set, a vehicle for power distribution, short and long range cinetheodolites, a hydraulic and pneumatic vehicle, and a vehicle for the transport and storage of the oxygen. A trailer was used as a fuel tank, with a capacity of 6000 gallons. A further three trailers were used to transport liquid oxygen, with a capacity of 4000 gallons each.

=== 1st I.S. Unit ===
The 1st I.S. Unit, commanded by a Colonel through its history, controlled five subordinate groups:

- 56th I.S. Group in Gioia del Colle; operational from 8 May 1960.
- 57th I.S. Group in Mottola; operational from 1 July 1960.
- 58th I.S. Group in Laterza; operational from 1 October 1960.
- 59th I.S. Group in Altamura alta; operational from September 1960.
- 60th I.S. Group in Gravina in Puglia operational from 1 August 1960.

=== 2nd I.S. Unit ===
The 2nd I.S. Unit, which was led by a colonel until February 1961 and then by a lieutenant colonel, controlled the other five subordinate groups:

- 108th I.S. Group in Altamura Bassa; operational from September 1960.
- 109th I.S. Group in Spinazzola; operational from 1 November 1960.
- 110th I.S. Group in Irsina; operational from 1 December 1960.
- 111th I.S. Group in Acquaviva delle Fonti; operational from 1 January 1961.
- 112th I.S. Group in Matera operational from 1 March 1961.

=== U.S. Units ===
Alongside the Italian units, there were two USAF units: 7230th Support Squadron and, later, the 305th Munitions Maintenance, for a total of less than 400 troops ordinarily headquartered in Taranto.

== See also ==
- UGM-27 Polaris
- Italian nuclear weapons program
- 3rd Missile Brigade "Aquileia"
