= Multilateral Force =

1960s proposal of nuclear-armed NATO warships

The Multilateral Force (MLF) was an American proposal to produce a fleet of ballistic missile submarines and warships, each crewed by international NATO personnel, and armed with multiple nuclear-armed Polaris ballistic missiles. Its mission would be a nuclear defence of Western Europe against Soviet threats in the Cold War while allowing NATO members besides the U.S. to play a role in nuclear warfare. The proposal was floated by the Eisenhower, Kennedy, and Johnson administrations. It was opposed by Britain and faded out in the mid 1960s. It was never adopted.

== History ==
The proposal was inspired by complaints of NATO countries that the nuclear defense of Europe was beholden to the Americans, who held the bulk of nuclear capability. The proposed fleet of warships would be crewed and operated by NATO command, instead of an assortment of independent forces ultimately under their own national banners. In this way, other NATO powers were theoretically ensured an active role in European defense.

The idea of using surface ships as part of the force received criticism in Europe, who felt that surface ships would be vulnerable to attack, while a wholly submarine force would be more difficult to eliminate. President Kennedy argued that using only submarines would defeat the purpose of minimizing American control of the force, as the United States was the primary power capable of building the requisite number of submarines and training their crews. Including surface vessels would allow for greater European involvement in both construction and training, argued Kennedy, who also dismissed the notion that an entire pan-Europe nuclear-armed fleet could be eliminated before any of them could commit retaliatory strikes.

The proposal eventually fell flat when American and European differences over basing strategies and financing could not be reconciled. The Italian cruiser Giuseppe Garibaldi was actually refitted with four launchers for Polaris missiles. Despite the successful launching tests, the U.S. never went ahead with the MLF. Instead the Italian government set out to develop an indigenous nuclear weapons program, with a successful missile called Alfa, officially halted by Italian Nuclear Non-Proliferation Treaty ratification.

The prospect of having West Germany in the Multilateral Force was mocked by Tom Lehrer in the satirical song "MLF Lullaby".

== MLF experiment on USS Claude V. Ricketts ==
From June 1964 to the end of 1965 USS Claude V. Ricketts (DDG-5) was part of a mixed-manning experiment for the proposed MLF. Its crew consisted of 10 officers and 164 crew from the US Navy with the remainder (normally 24 officers and 330 enlisted) filled by sailors from West Germany, Italy, Greece, the United Kingdom, the Netherlands, and Turkey. Though the MLF never was created, Secretary of the Navy Paul Nitze stated that the project on Claude V. Ricketts was successful.

== See also ==
- European Defence Community - an unsuccessful proposal of the early 1950s to create a multinational European army
- Nuclear sharing - a similar policy currently in practice.
