= Italian nuclear weapons program =

Italian Republic
- Nuclear program start date: Late 1960s (ended in 1975)
- NPT party: Yes
- Nuclear weapons stationing start date: September 1955; 70 years ago
- Nuclear weapons stationing provider: United States
- Current nuclear weapons stationed: 70–90 warheads

The Italian nuclear weapons program was an effort by Italy to develop nuclear weapons in the late 1960s and early 1970s. Italian scientists such as Enrico Fermi and Edoardo Amaldi had been at the forefront of the development of the technology behind nuclear weapons, but the country was banned from developing the technology at the end of the Second World War.

After abortive proposals to establish a multilateral program with NATO allies in the 1950s and 1960s, Italy launched a national nuclear weapons program. The country converted the light cruiser Giuseppe Garibaldi and developed and tested a ballistic missile called Alfa. The program ended in 1975, upon Italy's accession to the Non-Proliferation Treaty. Currently, Italy does not produce or possess nuclear weapons, but takes part in the NATO nuclear sharing program, hosting B61 nuclear bombs at the Aviano and Ghedi Air Bases.

== Background ==
Italian physicists, such as the Via Panisperna boys led by Enrico Fermi, had been at the forefront of the development of nuclear physics. Indeed, some, like Fermi, took part in the Manhattan Project and the creation of the first nuclear weapon during the Second World War. At the end of the war, the Italian Armed Forces wished to have nuclear capability. The Italian Army was particularly keen to acquire nuclear weapons, seeing them primarily in a tactical role.

The Army was confronted with defending mountain passes, which would channel any Warsaw Pact advance, and therefore made ideal targets for nuclear weapons. However, 1947 Peace Treaty banned the country from developing its own nuclear weapons. In the new geopolitical situation of the emerging Cold War, Italy created a political strategy that relied on multilateralism, principally through a close relationship with the United States, membership of NATO and greater European integration, for its defence. A similar attitude was taken for its nuclear weapons program.

== Initial US deployments ==
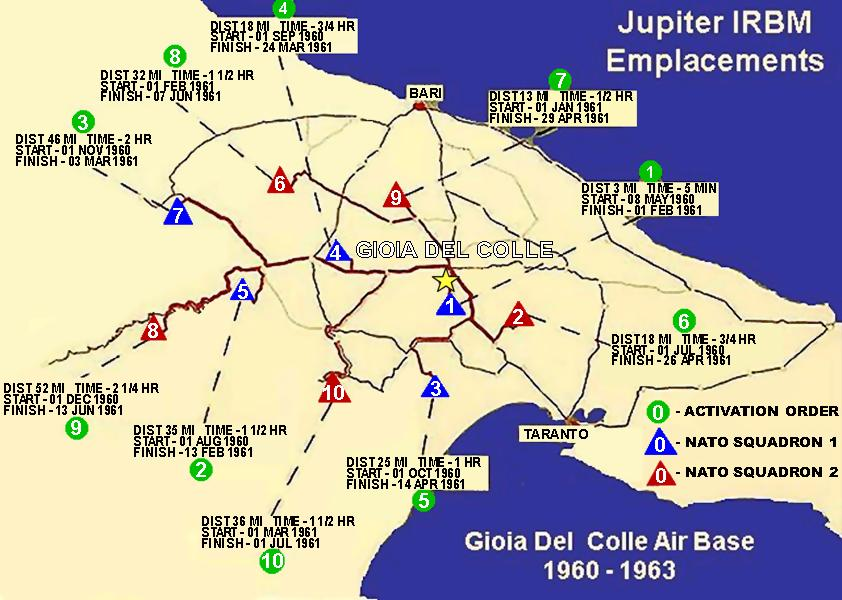
Jupiter deployment sites

The first nuclear weapons deployed on Italian soil were two battalions MGR-1 Honest John and MGM-5 Corporal missiles in September 1955, In time of war, they were to be used to slow the advance of enemy forces attacking across the Austrian and Yugoslavian borders, providing the Italian Army with sufficient time for a full mobilization. They were supported by other nuclear weapons, including Atomic demolition munitions. They were followed by 90 MIM-14 Nike Hercules surface-to-air missiles with W31 warheads in 1960. However, these were not Italian weapons; the United States Army maintained ownership, custody and control of all these systems.

For Italy, this was insufficient. The country argued for greater involvement, with Minister of Defence Paolo Emilio Taviani saying on 29 November 1956 that the Italian government was trying to persuade their "Allies to remove the unjustified restrictions regarding the access of NATO countries to new weapons."

The decision by Switzerland on 23 December 1958 to pursue a nuclear weapons program put an additional impetus on Italy. Pressure was applied on the United States to provide additional nuclear weapons. On 26 March 1959, an agreement was signed under which the Italian Air Force received 30 PGM-19 Jupiter intermediate range ballistic missiles (IRBMs) to operate from Gioia del Colle Air Base.

The first missiles arrived on 1 April 1960. This time missiles were operated by an Italian brigade, the 36ª Aerobrigata, and the Americans provided the warheads under a dual key arrangement (Italian: doppia chiave), which led the Italian government to believe it had greater control over the deterrent, and thus more power in NATO. The new missiles could be used "for the execution of NATO plans and policies in times of peace as well as war".

The deployment did not last long, however, and, on 5 January 1963, the United States announced that they would withdraw the Jupiter missiles as a consequence of the Cuban Missile Crisis, under an agreement with the Soviet Union that the United States would withdraw its missiles from Italy and Turkey in return for the Soviet Union withdrawing its missiles from Cuba. The decision was approved by the Italian government and the missile brigade was deactivated on 1 April 1963.

== Multilateral Force ==
In the meantime, Italy explored working develop a European nuclear force within the NATO, the Multilateral Force (MLF). MLF was a concept promoted by the United States to place all NATO nuclear weapons not operated by their own services under joint control by American and European forces, with a dual-key arrangement. For the United States, the MLF was an attempt to balance the desire of other members of NATO to play a role in nuclear deterrence with their interest in bringing existing and potential Western nuclear arsenals under the umbrella of a more cohesive NATO alliance.

The program built on previous discussions between European nations on a collaborative nuclear program. Italy, France and Germany had worked on a joint nuclear deterrent, but these were curtailed in 1958 by Charles de Gaulle's desire for an independent French deterrent. The MLF was pursued by the Kennedy and Johnson administrations, and formed a fundamental part of the Nassau Agreement between the United States and the United Kingdom, and the attempted accession of the United Kingdom to the European Economic Community (EEC) in 1961.

Under the MLF, the United States proposed that various NATO countries operate the UGM-27 Polaris IRBM on seaborne platforms, both nuclear submarines and surface ships. The Italian Navy proposed a nuclear powered submarine and a conversion of a cruiser. Announced in July 1959, the program paralleled similar work in the US. The Navy took the light cruiser Giuseppe Garibaldi out of service and rebuilt the ship between 1957 and 1961 as a guided missile cruiser with launchers for four Polaris missiles. The successful test of the missiles took place in September 1962. Shortly afterwards, in December 1962, Italian Minister of Defence Giulio Andreotti officially asked the United States for assistance in developing nuclear propulsion for its fleet.

The Italian government saw the growth of the movement to halt the proliferation of nuclear weapons as a major challenge to its nuclear program. At the Eighteen Nation Committee on Disarmament, the Italian government argued that multilateral activity like the MLF was excluded from any agreement on non-proliferation, but found that the Soviet Union required that MLF be terminated as part of their negotiations on the Non-Proliferation Treaty, and the United States all but killed the agreement on 17 December 1964 with National Security Action Memorandum No. 322.

== Italy's domestic program ==
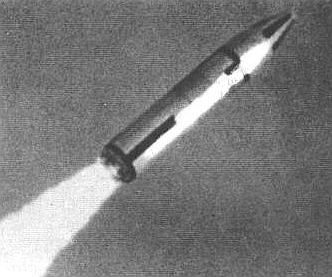
Test launch of Alfa in 1975

With the failure of its multilateral efforts, Italy looked again at creating an independent deterrent. Italy had experience with nuclear technology, with a well developed nuclear power industry with BWR, Magnox, and PWR technologies, as well as the 5MW RTS-1 'Galileo Galilei' test reactor at CAMEN (Italian: Centro Applicazioni Militari Energia Nucleare, Center for Military Applications of Nuclear Energy). It also had a large number of nuclear capable aircraft, including the Lockheed F-104 Starfighter, and was developing the Panavia Tornado with nuclear strike in mind.

=== Alfa ===
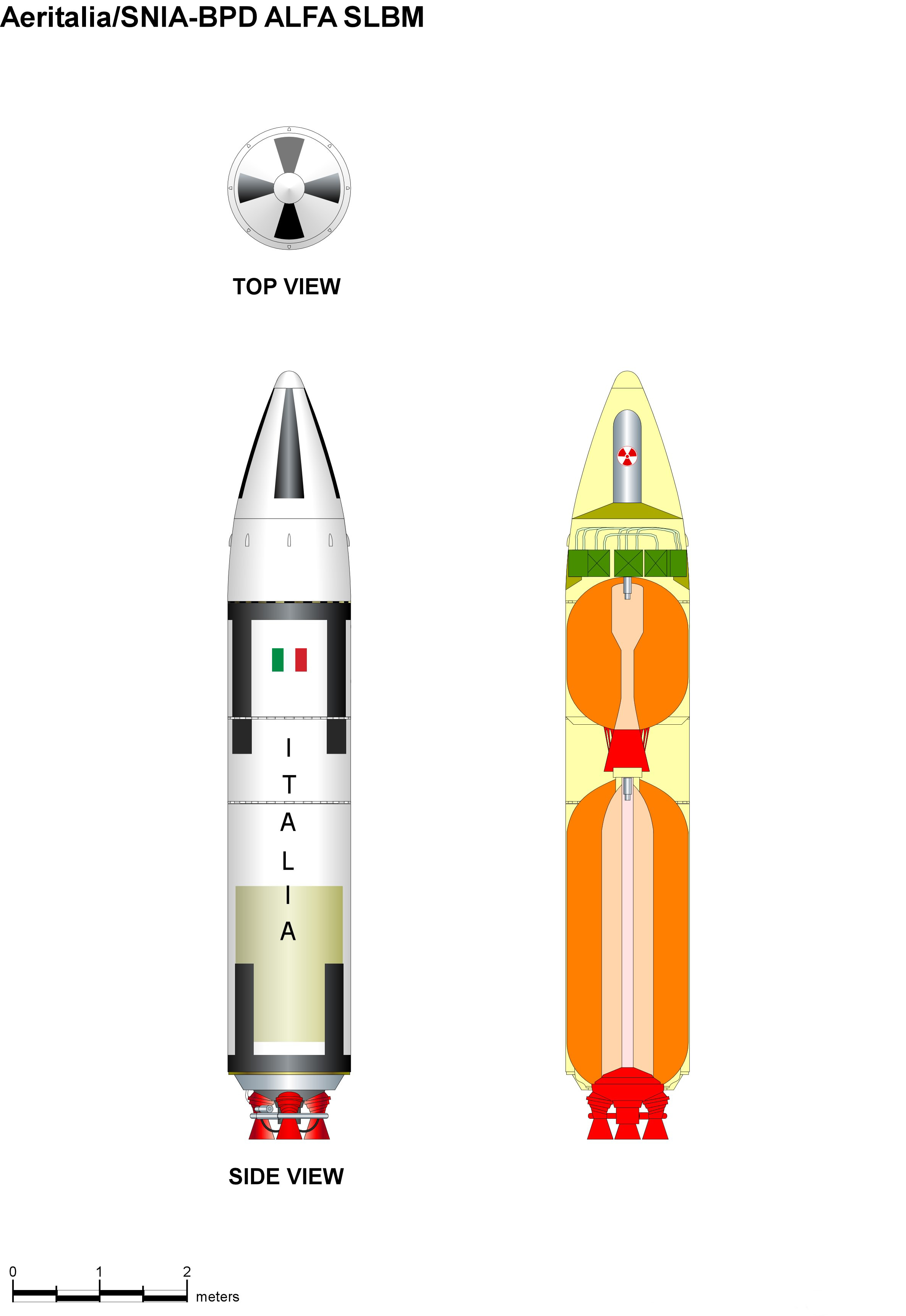
Italian Alfa missile side and cutaway views

In 1971, the Italian Navy began an indigenous program to develop ballistic missiles called Alfa. Officially the project was termed as a development effort for a study on efficient solid-propellant rockets for civil and military applications. It was planned as a two-stage rocket and could be carried on submarines or ships. Ever since 27 March 1960, when Admiral Pecori Giraldi had argued that a seaborne nuclear force was the most resistant to attack, the navy had looked for an opportunity to take on a nuclear role. Alfa was 6.5 metres (21 ft) long and had a diameter of 1.37 m (4 ft 6 in).

The first stage of the Alfa was 3.85 m (12.6 ft) long and contained 6 tonnes (5.9 long tons; 6.6 short tons) of solid rocket fuel. It supplied a thrust of 232 kilonewtons (52,000 lb_{f}) for a duration of 57 seconds. It could carry a 1,000 kilograms (2,205 lb) warhead for a range of 1,600 kilometres (990 mi), placing European Russia and Moscow in range from the Adriatic Sea. After the first stage motor was fired eleven times in static tests, three test missiles with inert second stages were successfully launched at Salto di Quirra in Sardinia, the last on 6 April 1976.

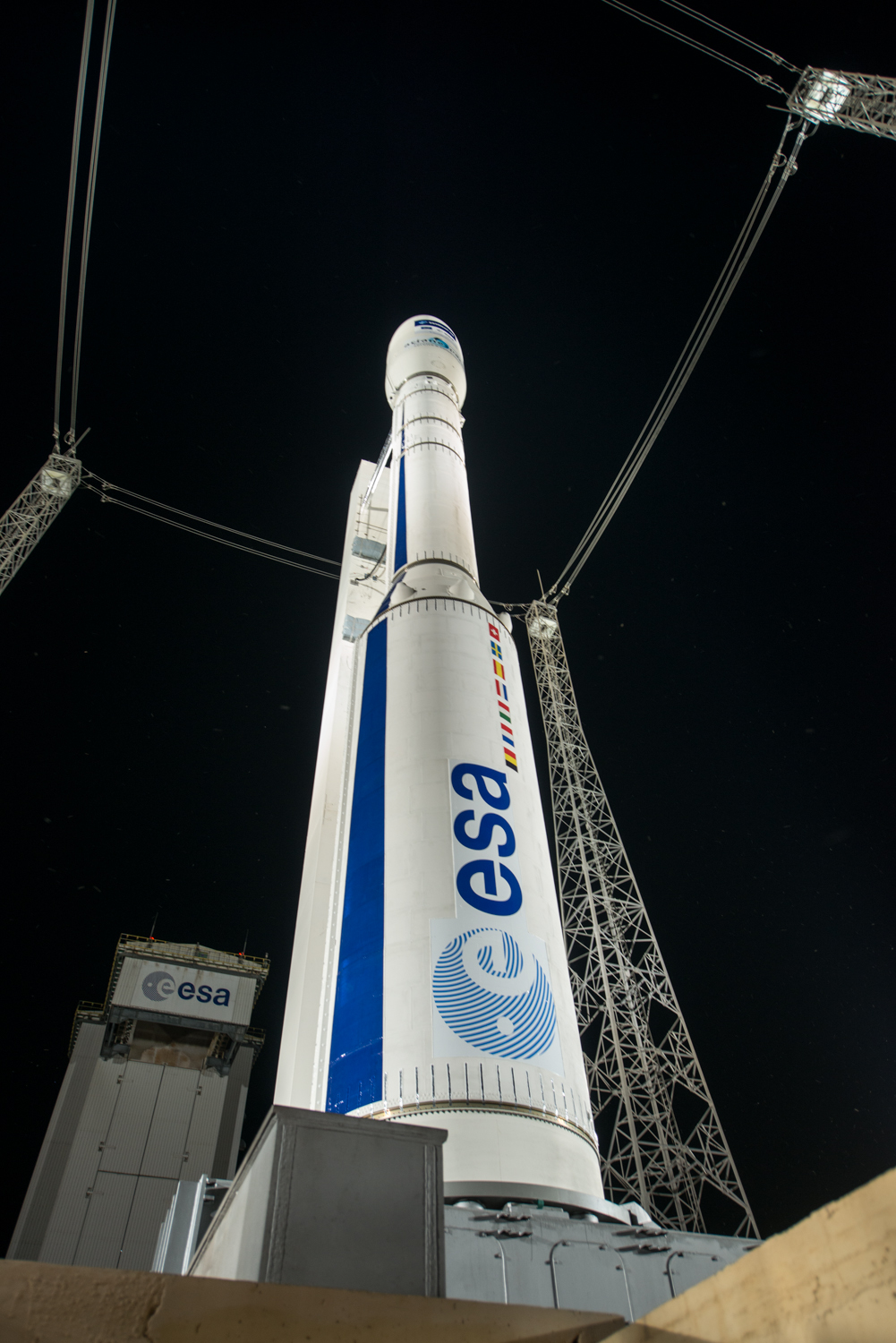
The technological heritage of Alfa is today in the current Vega rocket.

However, the combination of high costs of over 6 billion lira and a changing political climate meant that the project was doomed. In addition, there was an increasing risk of nuclear escalation outside Europe and domestic pressure for Italy to play its part in reducing the nuclear tension. These combined with pressure from the United States led to Italy abandoning its nuclear weapons program and ratifying the Treaty on the Non-Proliferation of Nuclear Weapons on 2 May 1975.

The technological heritage of Alfa is today in light solid-propellant space launchers, like the current Vega rocket. In more recent years, the country, working as part of the European Space Agency, has demonstrated the reentry and landing of a capsule called IXV.

== Popular attitudes to nuclear weapons ==
In the 1950s, the Italian population was generally considered ignorant on matters of the high politics of the recently emerged Atomic Age. While there was a strong awareness of the risk of nuclear war and a desire for disarmament, this was not widely articulated and public discourse was rare. The attitude towards the basing of nuclear weapons on Italian soil was generally on political lines, with followers of Christian Democracy being positive and supporters of the Italian Communist Party being against. The position of the other parties varied.

A broader movement for nuclear disarmament, and against nuclear weapons testing, emerged in the mid-1950s. A combination of Christian pacifists and marxists, many of whom were not affiliated to the main political parties, collaborated in a series of publications and demonstrations. At the same time, Italian physicists like Edoardo Amaldi spoke out against the use of nuclear research in war, particularly through multinational action like the Pugwash Conferences on Science and World Affairs. Throughout the 1960s and 1970s, programs and magazine articles on the dangers of nuclear war remained popular and the level of discussion on the issue increased. The creation of an Italian nuclear deterrent was not widely supported, and when new US weapons were deployed, the government kept them as quiet as possible to avoid unleashing a backlash.

== Nuclear weapons in Italy since 1975 ==
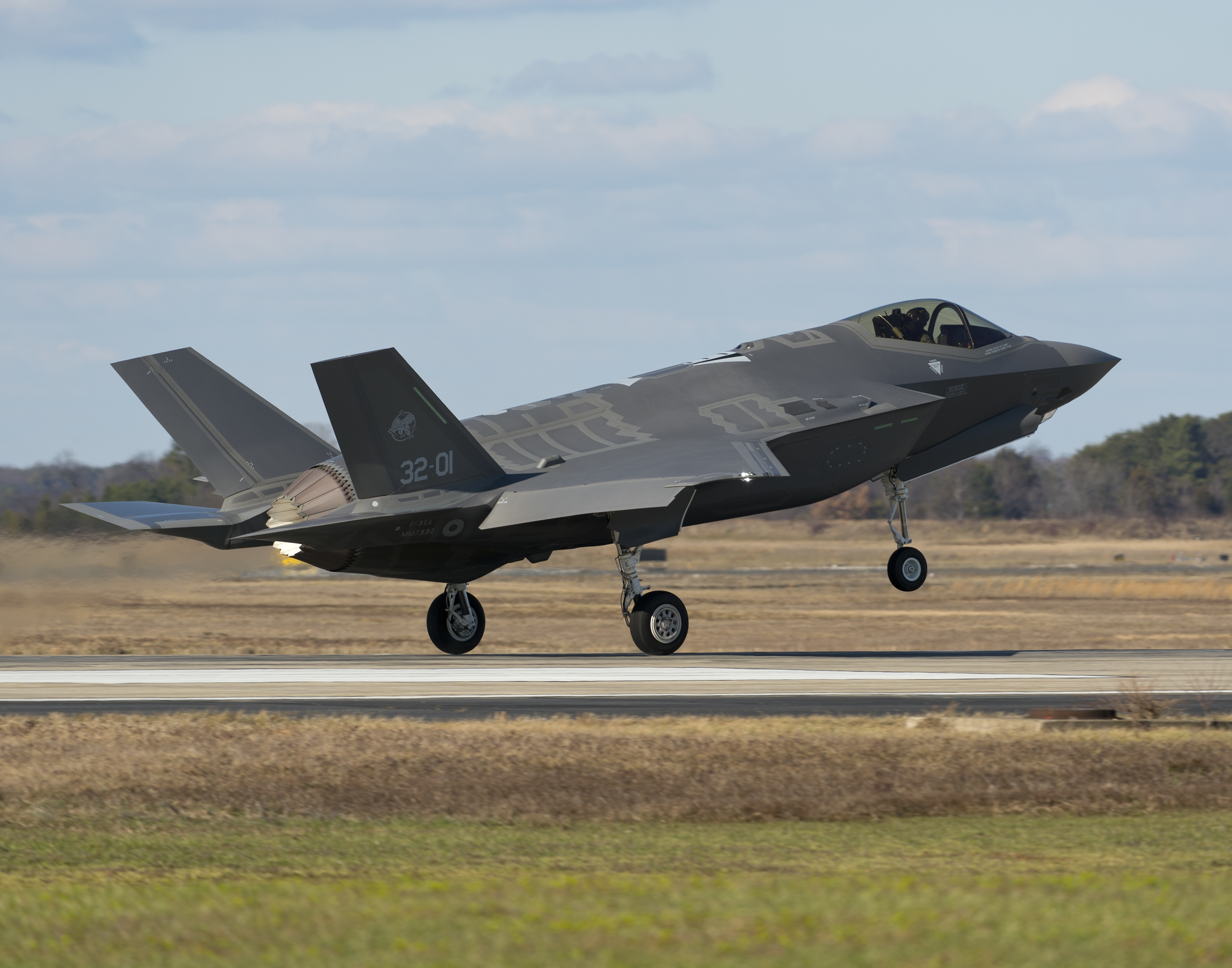
The Italian Air Force flies the F-35 which is expected to be able to carry the B61 nuclear bomb by 2026.

Since ratifying the Treaty on the Non-Proliferation of Nuclear Weapons and halting its own program, Italy has continued to host nuclear weapons on its soil. The country remained part of the NATO nuclear sharing program and has been used by the United States Army for their deployment of the BGM-109G Ground Launched Cruise Missile, MGM-52 Lance tactical ballistic missile and W33, W48 and W79 artillery shells. The Italian Army's 3rd Missile Brigade "Aquileia" was trained to use the munitions.

The country has been an active participant in the program, for example, taking a lead in March 1979 in the deployment of what would become the BGM-109G ahead of the other NATO members. By the early 1980s several US nuclear weapons units were deployed in Italy in support of the Italian Armed Forces, as follows:

- 599th US Army Artillery Group
  - 28th Field Artillery Warhead Support Group
  - 62nd Engineer Atomic Demolition Munitions Company
  - 69th Ordnance Company, Special Ammunition, Direct Support
- US Air Force 183rd Munition Support Squadron

B61 nuclear bombs were also stationed in Italy. It is believed that the Italian Air Force could use these weapons in case of war: in 2005, former president Francesco Cossiga stated that during the Cold War Italy's role in a planned retaliation consisted in striking Czechoslovakia and Hungary had the Warsaw Pact waged nuclear war against NATO. He acknowledged the presence of U.S. nuclear weapons in Italy, and speculated about the possible presence of British and French nuclear weapons on Italian soil.

During the 1980s, however, there was an increasing popular movement against nuclear weaponry. At the same time as the Greenham Common Women's Peace Camp was being set up in Berkshire, England, 60,000 people marched from Perugia to Assisi against nuclear war on 27 September. The following month, between 200,000 and 300,000 people marched in Rome. The movement was politically broad, attracting mainly young people, and grew rapidly. The march on 22 October 1982 attracted between half a million and one million supporters. The movement received another boost in 1987 when, in the wake of the Chernobyl disaster, a series of referendums demonstrated popular opinion against nuclear power.

The United States Army removed their last nuclear weapons from Italy in 1992 when they withdrew the last Lance missile. However, for many people, this did not go far enough. In March 2008, 67,248 Italian citizens signed a petition to declare the country a nuclear-free zone. In June, senior politicians across the political spectrum, Massimo D'Alema, Arturo Parisi, Gianfranco Fini, Giorgio La Malfa and Francesco Calogero, signed a statement in favour of disarmament.

As of 2015, there were between 70 and 90 B61 nuclear bombs mod 3, mod 4 and mod 7 stored in two locations, 50 at the Aviano Air Base, and from 20 to 40 at the Ghedi Air Base. They can be delivered by USAF General Dynamics F-16 Fighting Falcons of 31st Fighter Wing that are based at Aviano and Italian Panavia Tornados of 6º Stormo Alfredo Fusco that are based at Ghedi. The Tornado fleet will potentially be replaced by Lockheed Martin F-35 Lightning II, which is expected to be certified nuclear-capable with the B-61 by 2026.

== See also ==
- Nuclear power in Italy
