= Giulio Cesare Graziani =

Italian World War II pilot

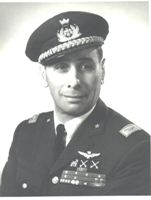
- Giulio Cesare Graziani
- Born: 15 January 1915; Affile, Kingdom of Italy
- Died: 23 December 1998 (aged 83); Rome, Italy
- Military career
- Allegiance: Kingdom of Italy
- Service: Regia Aeronautica, Italian Air Force
- Service years: 1936–1975
- Rank: Generale di squadra aerea
- Conflicts: World War II; East African campaign; Battle of the Mediterranean
- Awards: Gold Medal of Military Valor, Grand Officer of the Order of Merit of the Italian Republic

Giulio Cesare Graziani (24 January 1915 Affile – 23 December 1998 Rome) was an Italian aviator, and one of the most famous Italian pilots of the Savoia-Marchetti SM.79 Sparviero torpedo bomber, the "Damned Hunchback", in World War II.

== Career ==
Born on 24 January 1915 the son of Ermenegildo and Giovanna Lonfernini, Graziani developed an early interest in aviation, gaining his pilots licence before the age of 20 at Rimini Airport with a Caproni Ca.100 thanks to the influence of Rodolfo Graziani. He joined the Regia Aeronautica and served initially flying Savoia-Marchetti SM.81 bomber aircraft at the start of World War II.

Savoia-Marchetti SM.79 flown by Graziani

During 1940, he transferred to the Savoia-Marchetti SM.79 and developed particular skill attacking shipping with torpedoes, initially in the Red Sea theatre and later over the Mediterranean Sea. He was injured in action attacking Port Sudan in December 1940 but successfully piloted his aircraft home, for which he was awarded the Gold Medal of Military Valor. On 13 October 1941, Graziani was involved in the attack on the battleships HMS Barham and HMS Queen Elizabeth, along with a fleet of four cruisers and twelve destroyers. He was also responsible for a night raid on shipping in the harbour at Philippeville which destroyed one ship and damaged another on 20 November 1942.

Following the Armistice of Cassibile, Graziani flew Martin Baltimores for the Italian Co-belligerent Air Force, flying a total of 78 bombing missions. After the war, Graziani was heavily involved in the deployment of the PGM-19 Jupiter nuclear missiles in Italy. He was promoted to Generale di squadra aerea in 1969 and retired in 1975.

== Legacy ==
The 70º Stormo of the current Aeronautica Militare Italiana, based at Latina Air Base, was named after him.
