= Alfa (rocket) =

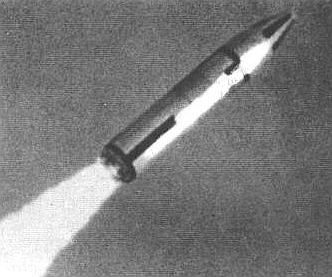
- Test launch of an Alfa
- Type: Intermediate range ballistic missile
- Place of origin: Italy

Service history
- In service: 1973–76
- Used by: Italian Navy

Production history
- Manufacturer: Aeritalia, Selenia, Snia BPD
- No. built: unknown

Specifications
- Mass: 8,000 kilograms (18,000 lb)
- Length: 6.5 metres (21 ft)
- length: 3.85 metres (12.6 ft) first stage
- Height: 6.5 metres (21 ft)
- Diameter: 1.37 metres (54 in)
- Warhead: Nuclear warhead (planned)
- Engine: first stage, solid fuel rocket 250 kN (56,000 lbf) thrust second stage, solid fuel rocket thrust unknown
- Operational range: 1,600 kilometres (990 mi) with 1 tonne warhead
- Boost time: first stage, 57 seconds second stage, unknown
- Guidance system: Inertial
- Launch platform: surface vessels

Alfa was the designation of an Italian ballistic missile program that started in 1971 under the control of the GRS (Gruppo di Realizzazione Speciale Interforze). It was related to the Polaris A-3 missile.

== Development ==
Born from the development effort for efficient solid-propellant rocket engines, the Alfa was planned as a two-stage missile. Test launches with an upper stage mockup took place between 1973 and 1975, from Salto di Quirra.

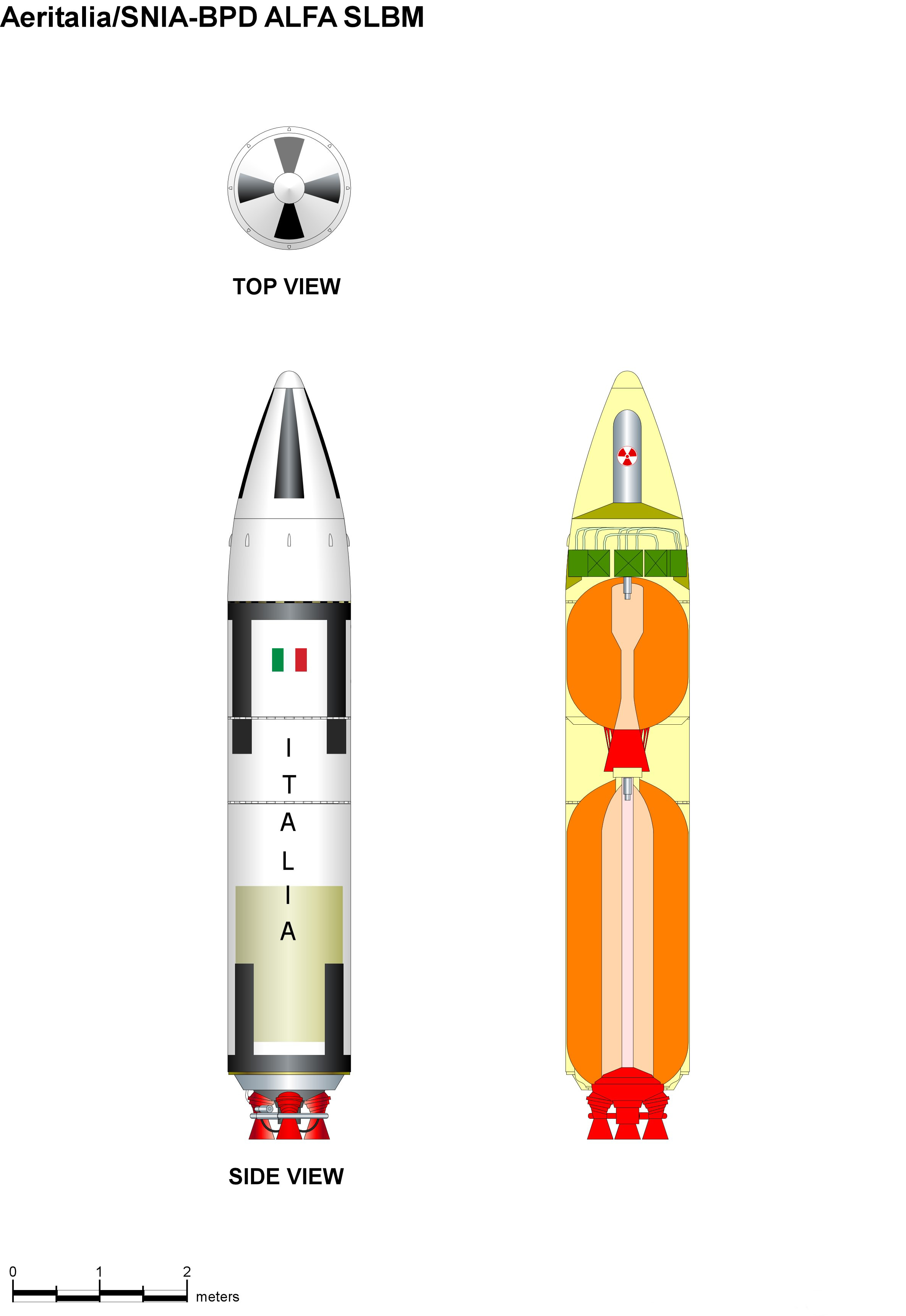
Italian Alfa missile side and cutaway views

The Alfa was 6.5 metres (21 ft) long and had a diameter of 1.37 metres (4 ft 6 in). The first stage of the Alfa was 3.85 metres (12.6 ft) long and contained 6 t of HTPB-based composite solid propellant (73% AP, 15% binder and 12% aluminium). It supplied a thrust of 232 kN for a duration of 57 seconds. It could carry a one tonne warhead for a range of 1,600 kilometres (990 mi), placing European Russia and Moscow in range of the Adriatic Sea.

Italy has been active in the space sector since 1957, conducting launch and control operations from the Luigi Broglio Space Centre. The advanced Scout and Vega launchers currently used by the European Space Agency (ESA) derive their technological basis partially from Alfa studies.

== See also ==
- Italian nuclear weapons program
