= List of power stations in Italy =

The following page lists power stations in Italy.

== List of largest power stations ==
This is a list of power stations in Italy with a capacity greater than 100 MW.

Name	Place	Province	Coordinates	Type	Capacity (MW)	Company	Completion
Grosio	Grosio	SO		Hydroelectric	428	A2A	
del Mincio	Ponti sul Mincio	MN	45°23′56″N 10°42′48″E	Fossil-fuel	400	A2A	1983
Premadio	Valdidentro	SO		Hydroelectric	226	A2A	
Timpagrande	Cotronei	KR		Hydroelectric	191	A2A	
Orichella	San Giovanni in Fiore	CS		Hydroelectric	129	A2A	
Cassano d'Adda	Cassano d'Adda	MI	45.5121965°N 9.5106304°E	Fossil-fuel	848	A2A	2003-2024
Falconara	Marittima	AN		Fossil-fuel	100	Api Energia	2001
Acerra	Acerra	NA		Fossil-fuel	100	Cofely Italia S.p.A.	
Valpelline	Valpelline	AO		Hydroelectric	130	CVA	
di Turbigo	Turbigo	MI		Fossil-fuel	1285	Edipower	2008-2022
San Filippo del Mela	San Filippo del Mela	ME		Fossil-fuel	960	Edipower	1971-1976
Sermide	Sermide	MN		Fossil-fuel	1151	Edipower	2004
di Piacenza	Piacenza	PC		Fossil-fuel	806	Edipower	2006
Mese	Mese	SO		Hydroelectric	377	Edipower	
Somplago	Cavazzo Carnico	UD		Hydroelectric	309	Edipower	
Chivasso	Chivasso	TO		Fossil-fuel	130	Edipower	
Torviscosa	Torviscosa	UD		Fossil-fuel	867	Edison	2006
Simeri Crichi	Simeri Crichi	CZ		Fossil-fuel	885	Edison	2008
Altomonte	Altomonte	CS		Fossil-fuel	808	Edison	2006
Marghera Levante	Marghera	VE		Fossil-fuel	1546	Edison	2001-2023
Candela	Candela	FG		Fossil-fuel	401	Edison	2005
Venina	Piateda	SO		Hydroelectric	146	Edison	
Sarmato	Sarmato	PC		Fossil-fuel	145	Edison	
Jesi - Energia	Jesi	AN		Fossil-fuel	140	Edison	
San Quirico	Trecasali	PR		Fossil-fuel	135	Edison	
Bussi sul Tirino	Bussi sul Tirino	PE		Fossil-fuel	130	Edison	
Verzuolo - Gever	Verzuolo	CN		Fossil-fuel	120	Edison	
Porcari	Porcari	LU		Fossil-fuel	100	Edison	
Terni	Terni	TR		Fossil-fuel	100	Edison	
Sparanise	Sparanise	CE		Fossil-fuel	760	EGL Italia	2007
Rizziconi	Rizziconi	RC		Fossil-fuel	768	EGL Italia	2008
Rosignano (Rosen)	Rosignano Marittimo	LI		Fossil-fuel	536	Electrabel	1997-2018
Servola	Trieste	TS		Fossil-fuel	159	Elettra GLT	
Galleto	Terni	TR		Hydroelectric	530	Endesa Italia	
Valle Secolo	Larderello	PI		Geothermal	120	Enel	
Mucone 1	Acri	CS		Hydroelectric	101	Enel	
Federico II	Brindisi	BR		Fossil-fuel	2640	Enel	1991-1993
Torrevaldaliga Nord	Civitavecchia	RM		Fossil-fuel	1980	Enel	2009-2010
Rossano	Rossano	CS		Fossil-fuel	224	Enel	1995-1996
La Casella	Castel San Giovanni	PC		Fossil-fuel	1524	Enel	2002-2025
La Spezia	Liguria	SP		Fossil-fuel	682	Enel	2000
Andrea Palladio	Fusina/Venezia	VE		Fossil-fuel	860	Enel	2025
Edolo	Edolo	BS	46°10′15″N 10°20′52″E	Hydroelectric	1000	Enel	
Domenico Cimarosa	Presenzano	CE	41°22′53″N 14°5′25″E	Hydroelectric	1000	Enel	
Teodora	Ravenna	RA		Fossil-fuel	718	Enel	2002
Priolo Gargallo	Syracuse	SR		Fossil-fuel	743	Enel	2010
San Fiorano	Sellero	BS		Hydroelectric	268		1973
Ravenna Baiona		RA		Fossil-fuel	773	EniPower	2003
Pietrafitta	Piegaro	PG		Fossil Fuel	365		2003
Termini Imerese	Termini Imerese	PA		Fossil-fuel	1080	Enel	2004-2023
San Giacomo	Fano Adriano	TE		Hydroelectric	448	Enel	
Santa Barbara	Cavriglia	AR		Fossil-fuel	392	Enel	2006
Sulcis	Gonnessa	CI		Fossil-fuel	590	Enel	1986-2005
Provvidenza	L'Aquila	AQ		Hydroelectric	141	Enel	
Luigi Einaudi	Entracque	CN	44°13′29″N 07°23′10″E	Hydroelectric	1318	Enel	
Montorio	Montorio al Vomano	TE		Hydroelectric	110	Enel	
Roncovalgrande	Maccagno	VA	46°04′10″N 8°43′55″E	Hydroelectric	1016	Enel	
Ferrera Erbognone	Ferrera Erbognone	PV		Fossil-fuel	1006	EniPower	2004
Brindisi Nord	Brindisi	BR		Fossil-fuel	1283	EniPower	1967-2006
Mantova	Mantova	MN		Fossil-fuel	780	EniPower	2005
Tavazzano e Montanaso	Tavazzano con Villavesco; Montanaso Lombardo	LO	45°19′59″N 9°26′4″E	Fossil-fuel	1950	EPH	2005-2024
Ostiglia	Ostiglia	MN	45°3′35″N 11°8′15″E	Fossil-fuel	2058	EPH	2003-2025
Scandale	Scandale	KR		Fossil-fuel	814	EPH	2010
Livorno Ferraris	Livorno Ferraris	VC		Fossil-fuel	805	EPH	2008
Fiume Santo	Sassari	SS		Fossil-fuel	640	EPH	1992-1993
Ferrara	Ferrara	FE		Fossil-fuel	124	EPH	
Trapani	Trapani	TP		Fossil-fuel	215	EPH	1987-1988
Teverola	Teverola	CE		Fossil-fuel	124	FWI	
Voghera	Voghera	PV		Fossil-fuel	400	GDF Suez Energia Italia	2005
Taranto	Taranto	TA		Fossil-fuel	160	I.S.E.	
Moncalieri	Moncalieri	TO		Fossil-fuel	780	IREN Energia	2005-2009
Ottana	Ottana	NU		Fossil-fuel	140	OTTANA ENERGIA	
Leinì	Leini	TO		Fossil-fuel	380	Piemonte Energia	2007
Ferrara	Ferrara	FE		Fossil-fuel	762	S.E.F.	2006-2007
Sarroch	Sardinia	CA		Fossil-fuel	636	Sarlux	1970-2001
Cassino	Piedimonte San Germano	FR		Fossil-fuel	106	Serene	
Melfi	Melfi	PZ		Fossil-fuel	106	Serene	
Termoli	Termoli	CB		Fossil-fuel	844	Sorgenia	2006-2023
Modugno	Modugno	BA		Fossil-fuel	800	Sorgenia	2010
Turano-Bertonico	Turano Lodigiano-Bertonico	LO		Fossil-fuel	800	Sorgenia	2011
Aprilia	Aprilia	LT		Fossil-fuel	800	Sorgenia	2012
Torrevaldaliga Sud	Civitavecchia	RM		Fossil-fuel	1140	Tirreno Power	2004-2005
Vado Ligure	Quiliano	SV		Fossil-fuel	800	Tirreno Power	2007
Napoli Levante	Napoli	NA		Fossil-fuel	400	Tirreno Power	2009

== Other power stations by source ==
=== Geothermal (<100 MW) ===
Station	Capacity (MW)	Location
San Martino Power Station	40	
Rancia 2	18	Radicondoli

=== Hydroelectric (<100 MW) ===
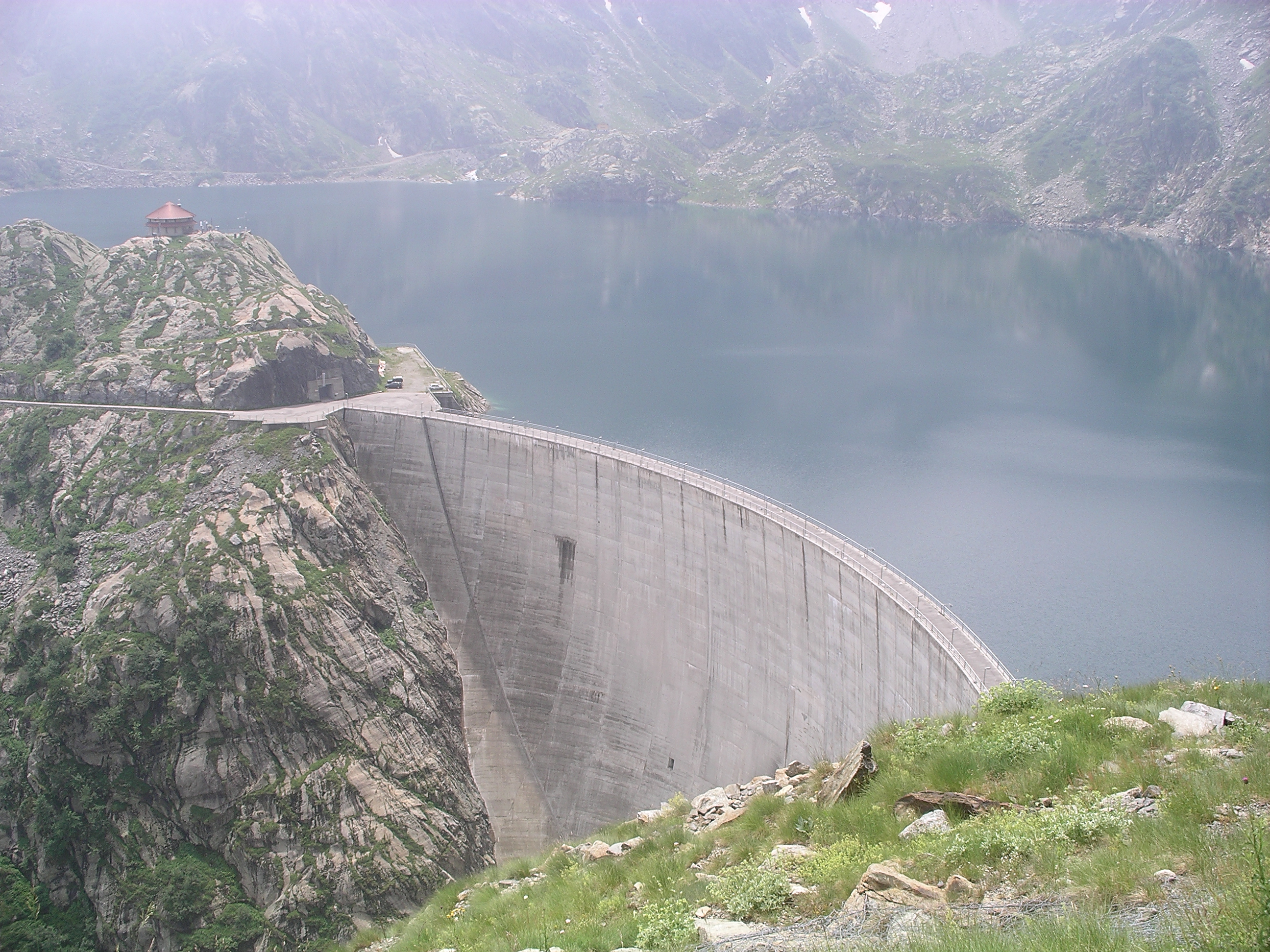
Chiotas Dam, part of Entracque plant, the biggest pumped-storage hydroelectric power plant in Italy

This is a list of hydroelectric power plants in Italy with a capacity between 10MW and 100MW.

Name	Place	Province	Capacity (MW)	Company
Sonico	Sonico	BS	73	Edison
Centrale di Avise	Avise	AO	70	CVA
Centrale idroelettrica di Torrite	Castelnuovo di Garfagnana	LU	67	Enel
Centrale di Andonno	Roccavione	CN	65	Enel
Centrale di Mezzocorona	Mezzocorona	TN	63	Edison
Centrale di Campore Basso	Turin	TO	57	Enel
Centrale di Ardenno	Sondrio	SO	57	Enel
Centrale di Pian Rocca	Borgo a Mozzano	LU	55	Enel
Centrale idroelettrica Mucone 2	Luzzi	CS	54	Enel
Centrale di Montjovet	Montjovet	AO	50	CVA
Centrale di Isola Serafini	Monticelli d'Ongina	PC	50	Enel
Centrale di Calusia	Caccuri	KR	49	A2A
Centrale di Lovero	Lovero	SO	49	A2A
Centrale di Bussolengo	Bussolengo	VR	48	Società Idroelettrica Medio Adige (SIMA)
Centrale idroelettrica Palazzo 2	Orsomarso	CS	46	Enel
Centrale di Morasco	Formazza	VB	46	Enel
Centrale di Pont-Saint-Martin	Pont-Saint-Martin	AO	45	CVA
Centrale di Gallicano	Gallicano	LU	43	Enel
Centrale di Signayes	Aosta	AO	42	CVA
Centrale di Ponte Caffaro	Bagolino	BS	41	Edison
Centrale di Quart	Nus	AO	40	CVA
Centrale di Pallanzeno	Pallanzeno	VB	40	Enel
Centrale di Crego	Crodo	VB	39	Enel
Centrale di Magisano	Magisano	CZ	39	A2A
Centrale di Covalou	Antey-Saint-André	AO	39	CVA
Centrale di Campo Moro	Sondrio	SO	36	Enel
Centrale di Brossasco	Brossasco	CN	36	Enel
Centrale di Albi	Albi	CZ	36	A2A
Centrale di Capodiponte	Ascoli Piceno	AP	33	Enel
Centrale di Isollaz	Challand-Saint-Victor	AO	32	CVA
Centrale Esterle	Cornate d'Adda - Porto d'Adda	MB	31	Edison
Centrale di Teglia	Pontremoli	MS	31	Edison
Centrale di Stazzona	Villa di Tirano	SO	30	A2A
Centrale di Chavonne	Villeneuve	AO	29	CVA
Centrale di Châtillon	Châtillon	AO	29	CVA
Centrale di Casteldelfino	Casteldelfino	CN	28	Enel
Centrale di Champagne 2	Villeneuve	AO	27	CVA
Centrale di Venamartello	Acquasanta Terme	AP	26	Enel
Centrale di Zuino	Gaby	AO	23	CVA
Centrale di Battiggio	Bannio Anzino	VB	23	Edison
Centrale di Ligonchio	Ligonchio	RE	23	Enel
Centrale di Quincinetto	Quincinetto	TO	22	CVA
Prati di Vizze	Val di Vizze	BZ	21	SEL / Edison
Centrale di Castelbello	Castelbello-Ciardes	BZ	21	SEL / Edison
Centrale di Verampio	Crodo	VB	21	?
Centrale ENEL di Castelnuovo	Castelnuovo di Garfagnana	LU	20	Enel
Centrale di Soverzene	Pieve di Cadore	BL	20	Enel
Centrale di Satriano 2	Satriano	CZ	20	A2A
Centrale di Braulio	Bormio	SO	19	A2A
Centrale di Hône 1	Hône	AO	18	CVA
Centrale di Les Perrères	Valtournenche	AO	18	CVA
Centrale di Satriano 1	Satriano	CZ	15	A2A
Centrale di Sillico	Sillano	LU	15	Enel Green Power
Centrale di Corfino	Pieve Fosciana	LU	15	Enel
Centrale idroelettrica di Sillano 2	Sillano	LU	15	Enel
Centrale di Fabbriche	Vagli Sotto	LU	15	Enel
Centrale idroelettrica di Sillano 1	Sillano	LU	15	Enel
Centrale di Ascoli Porta Romana	Ascoli Piceno	AP	14	Enel
Centrale di S. Damiano Macra	S. Damiano Macra	CN	12	Enel
Centrale Bertini	Cornate d'Adda - Porto d'Adda	MB	12	Edison
Centrale di Porto della Torre	Somma Lombardo	VA	12	Enel
Centrale di Crego	Crodo	VB	11	?
Centrale idroelettrica Coscile 1	San Basile	CS	11	Enel
Centrale di Gressoney	Gressoney-La-Trinité	AO	11	CVA
Centrale di Champagne 1	Villeneuve	AO	11	CVA
Centrale di Hône 2	Hône	AO	11	CVA
Nuova Ceretti	Montecrestese	VB	11	Idroelettriche Riunite S.p.a.
Centrale di Fucine	Viù	TO	11	Enel
Centrale di Fedio	Demonte	CN	10	Enel
Centrala Piancone	Portula	BI	10	Sistemi di Energia

=== Nuclear ===
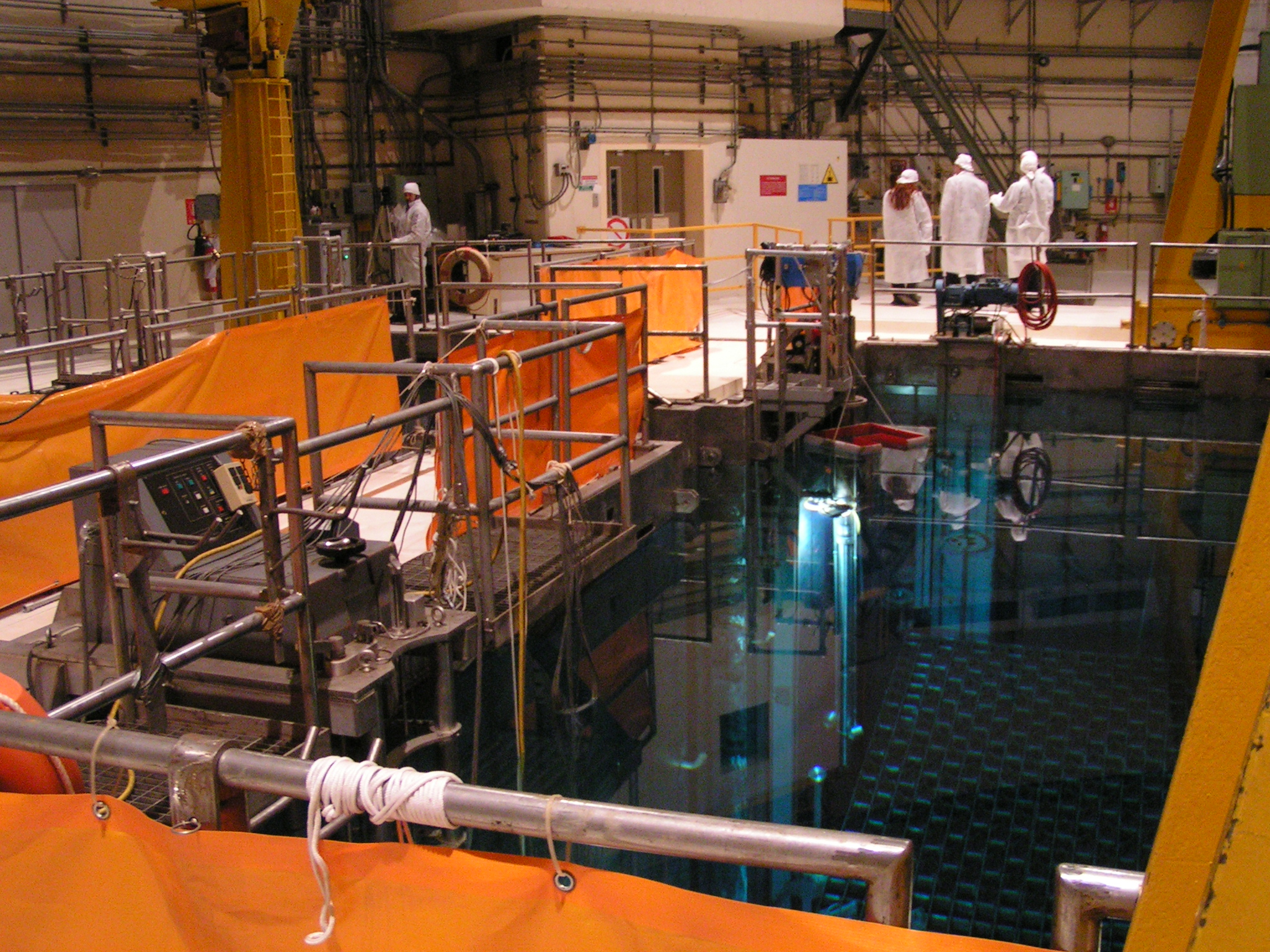
Caorso spent fuel pool in 2005

There are no active nuclear power stations in Italy.

Station	Place	Location	Capacity (MW)	Type	Start of operation	Shutdown	Decommissioned
Latina Nuclear Power Plant	Latina	41.4271944°N 12.8074944°E	153	Magnox	1963	1987	
Enrico Fermi Nuclear Power Plant	Trino	45.1833451°N 8.2773829°E	260	PWR	1964	1990	
Caorso Nuclear Power Plant	Caorso	45.072206°N 9.871999°E	860	BWR	1978	1990	
Garigliano	Sessa Aurunca	41.25849°N 13.83492°E	150	BWR	1964	1982	

=== Solar PV ===
Name of Plant	Peak capacity (MW)	Production (GWh/year)	Capacity factor (%)	Start of operation
Montalto di Castro Photovoltaic Power Station	84.2	140	19.0	2009-2010
Rovigo Photovoltaic Power Plant	70.6	--	--	2010
Serenissima Solar Park	48	--	--	2011
Cellino San Marco Solar Park	43	56	14.9	2010
Alfonsine Solar Park	36.2	--	--	2010
Sant'Alberto Solar Park	34.63	--	--	2010
Anguillara PV power plant	15	--	--	2010
Priolo PV power plant	13.5	--	--	2010
Loreo PV power plant	12.6	--	--	2010
Craco PV power plant	12	--	--	2010
Manzano PV power plant	11	--	--	2010

=== Wind ===
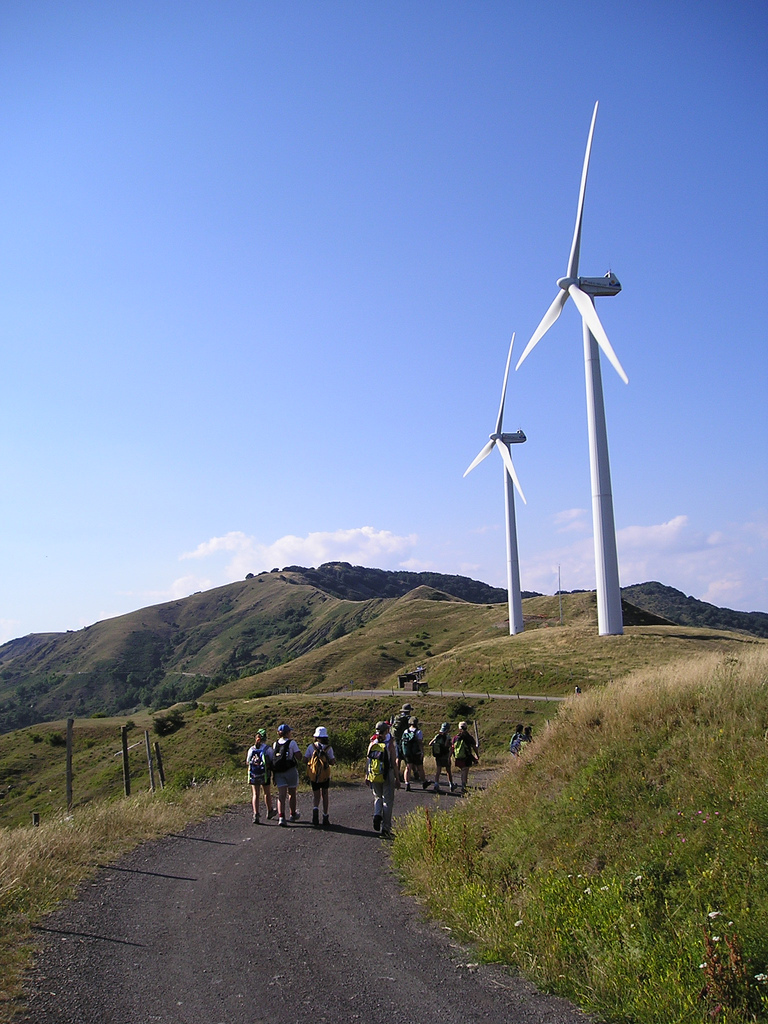
Wind turbines in Italy

Locale	Region	Province	Turbines	Capacity (MW)	Notes
Accadia	Puglia	FG	24	15.9	
Acquaspruzza	Molise	CB	2	0.8	
Aggius/Viddalba/Bortigiadas	Sardegna	SS	93	67.8	
Agrigento	Sicilia	AG	124	105	
Albanella	Campania	SA	10	8.5	
Alta Nurra	Sardegna	SS	7	12.3	
Andretta	Campania	AV		22	
Badia Calavena	Veneto	VR	2	1.35	
Baselice	Campania	BN		7.2	
Bisaccia	Campania	AV		48	
Bonorva – Altopiano di Campeda	Sardegna	SS	37	74	
Bortigiadas	Sardegna	OT	27	17.82	
Brindisi Montagna	Basilicata	PZ	1	2	
Brindisi Montagna	Basilicata	PZ	21	42	
Calice Ligure	Liguria	SV	3		
Caltavuturo	Sicilia	PA	56	48	
Campolieto	Molise	CB	21	19.14	
Camporeale	Sicilia	PA	24	20	
Capracotta	Molise	IS	13	9.35	
Castiglione Messer Marino	Abruzzo	CH	44	26.4	
Chianni	Toscana	PI	7	5.95	
Ciorlano	Campania	CE	10	20	
Civitacampomarano	Molise	CB	5	7.5	
Cocullo	Abruzzo	AQ	37	11.9	
Collarmele	Abruzzo	AQ	5	7.5	
Colle San Bernardo	Piemonte	CN	5	12.5	
Copertino	Puglia	LE	1	0.9	
Cutro	Calabria	KR	23	46	
Durazzano	Campania	BN	7	14	
Firenzuola	Toscana	FI	17	13.6	
Florinas	Sardegna	SS	10	20	
Foiano di Val Fortore	Campania	BN		5.4	
Fossato di Vico	Umbria	PG	2	1.5	
Fraine	Abruzzo	CH	15	9	
Francofonte	Sicilia	SR	24	72	
Frigento	Campania	AV		16	
Frosolone	Molise	IS		21.3	
Gorgoglione	Basilicata	MT		3.3	
Grottole	Basilicata	MT		54	
Isola Capo Rizzuto	Calabria	KR	48	120	
Jacurso	Calabria	CZ	21	42	offshore
Lacedonia	Campania	AV		40	
Lajatico	Toscana	PI	10	20	
Lecce	Puglia	LE	18	36	
Longano	Molise	IS	14	10.2	
Lucito	Molise	CB	17	34	
Macchia Valfortore	Molise	CB	12	10.2	
Macchiagodena	Molise	IS	19	16.15	
Mele	Liguria	GE	1	3	
Melissa	Calabria	KR	16	32	
Melissa e Strongoli	Calabria	KR	25	50	
Minervino	Puglia	BT		32	
Molinara	Campania	BN		14.4	
Monacilioni	Molise	CB	23	15.18	
Montarone	Molise	CB		15.3	
Montazzoli	Abruzzo	CH	16	9.6	
Monte Grighine (Villaurbana/Siamanna/Mogorella)	Sardegna		43	98.9	
Montecatini Val di Cecina	Toscana	PI	11	16.5	
Montefalcone di Val Fortore	Campania	BN		25.8	
Monteferrante	Abruzzo	CH	41	24.6	
Montemignaio	Toscana	AR	3	1.8	
Montemurro	Basilicata	PZ		29.1	
Monterenzio/Castel del Rio	Emilia-Romagna	BO	16	12.8	
Nicosia	Sicilia	EN	55	47	
Nulvi – Tergu	Sardegna	SS		29.8	
Nurri	Sardegna	CA		22.1	
Paliano	Lazio	FR	9	18	
Piansano	Lazio	VT	21	42	
Pianura di Campidano	Sardegna			70	
Pietracatella	Molise	CB	15	9.9	
Piombino	Toscana	LI	6	18	
Ploaghe	Sardegna	SS	32	27.22	
Pontedera	Toscana	PI	4	8	
Portoscuso	Sardegna	CA/CI	39	90	
Regalbuto	Sicilia	EN	20	50	
Rialto	Liguria	SV	3	2.4	
Ricigliano	Campania	SA		36	
Ripabottoni	Molise	CB	24	15.84	
Riparbella	Toscana	PI	10	20	
Rocca Rossa	Sicilia	PA	28	58	
Roccamandolfi	Molise	IS	12	10.2	
Roccaspinalveti	Abruzzo	CH	23	13.8	
Roio del Sangro	Abruzzo	CH	10	6	
Rotello	Molise	CB	20	40	
Saint-Denis	Valle d'Aosta	AO	3	2.55	
Salemi	Sicilia	TP	31	62	
San Benedetto Val di Sambro	Emilia-Romagna	BO	10	3.5	
San Giorgio la Molara	Campania	BN		19.8	
San Giovanni in Galdo	Molise	CB	9	13.5	
San Marco dei Cavoti	Campania	BN		11.4	
San Martino in Pensilis	Molise	CB		29	
San Pietro a Maida	Calabria	CZ	23	46	
Sant'Agata di Puglia	Puglia	FG	102	164	
Sant'Elia a Pianisi	Molise	CB	3	1.98	
Santa Luce	Toscana	PI	13	23.4	
Santa Luce/Casciana Terme	Toscana	PI	11	22	
Scampitella	Campania	AV		32	
Scansano	Toscana	GR	10	20	
Schiavi di Abruzzo	Abruzzo	CH	15	9	
Tarsia	Calabria	CS	16	32	
Terranova da Sibari	Calabria	CS	6	12	
Tocco da Casauria	Abruzzo	PE	4	3.2	
Tricase	Puglia	LE	24	90	
Tula	Sardegna	SS	68	83.8	
Ulassai	Sardegna	OG	48	96	
Vastogirardi	Molise	IS	23	19.55	
Viticuso	Lazio	FR	12	7.2	
Zeri	Toscana	MS	7	10.5	

== See also ==
- Lists of power stations
- List of largest power stations
