= Delio =

Delio may refer to:

== Given name ==
- Delio Caron (born c. 1924), Italian rugby player
- Délio dos Santos (died 2020), Brazilian politician
- Delio Fernández (born 1986), Spanish cyclist
- Delio Gamboa (1936–2018), Colombian footballer
- Delio Hernández Valadés (born 1956), Mexican politician
- Delio Morollón (1937–1992), Spanish footballer
- Delio Rodríguez (1916–1994), Spanish road racing cyclist and sprinter
- Delio Rossi (born 1960), Italian football manager and former footballer
- Delio Onnis (born 1948), Italian-Argentine footballer
- Delio Tessa (1886–1939), Italian poet
- Delio Toledo (born 1976), Paraguayan footballer

== Surname ==
- Michelle Delio, American journalist and writer
- Thomas DeLio (born 1951), American experimental music composer

== See also ==
- Delio Lake, is a lake in the Province of Varese, Lombardy, Italy
