= Solar power in Italy =

- Installed capacity: 36.01 GW (2023) (9th)
- Annual generation: 35.81 TWh (2023)
- Capacity per capita: 610.9 W (2023)
- Share of electricity: 12.3% (2023)

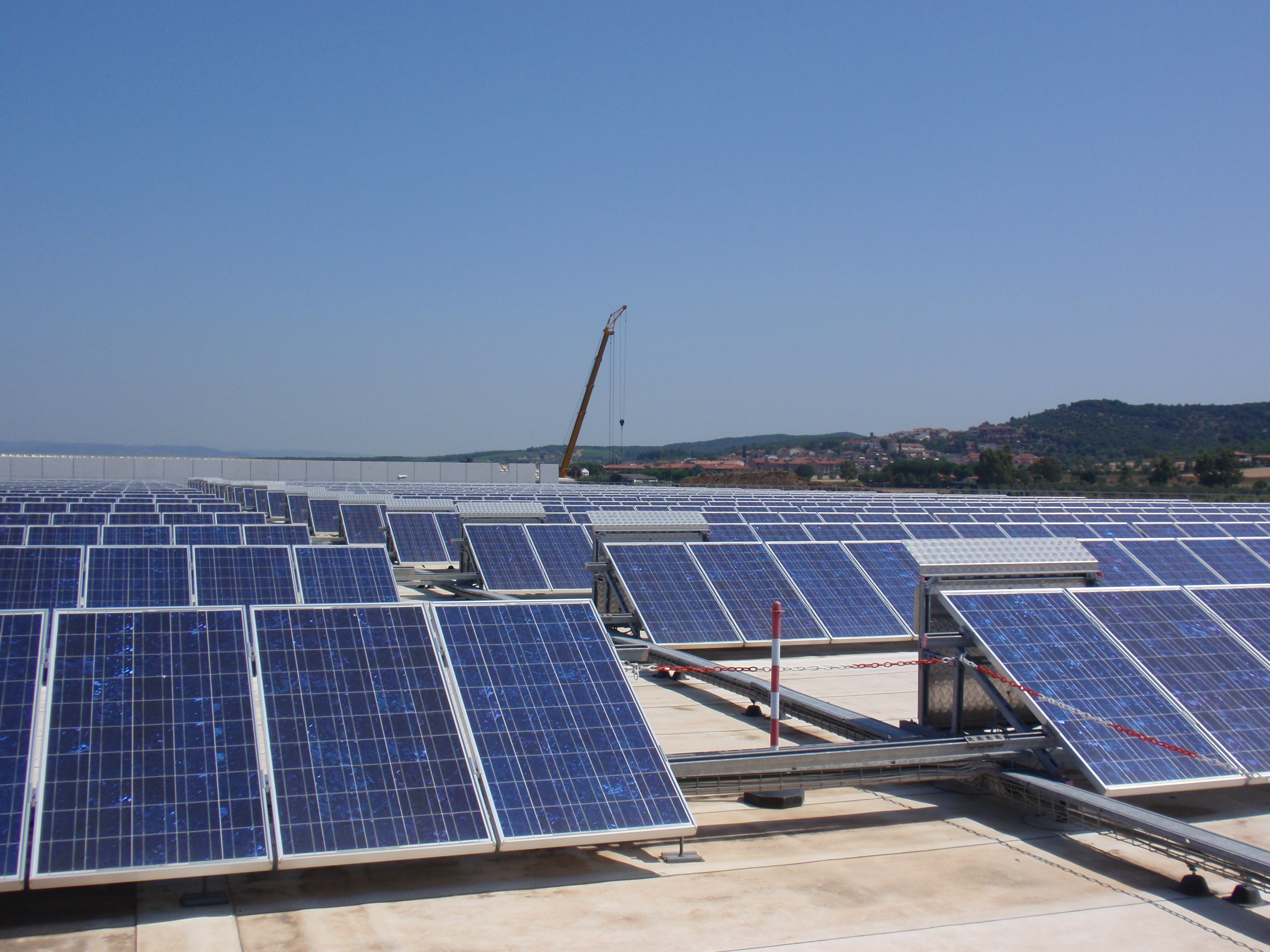
Solar panels in Piombino. Italy is one of the world's largest producers of renewable energy.

Solar power is an important contributor to electricity generation in Italy, accounting for 12.3% of total generation in 2023, and with a total installed capacity of 36.01 GW. As of 2023, government plans are targeting solar PV capacity to rise to 79 GW by 2030.

Like most countries, solar power usage in Italy was minimal before the 21st century, accounting for less than 0.1% of electricity in 2000. During the 2000s, Italy was the third country after Germany and Spain to experience a boom in solar installations after actively promoting the energy source through government incentives. Solar capacity growth slowed in the 2010s due to cessation of governmental subsidy programmes, but installations have picked up again in the 2020s.

== Solar potential ==
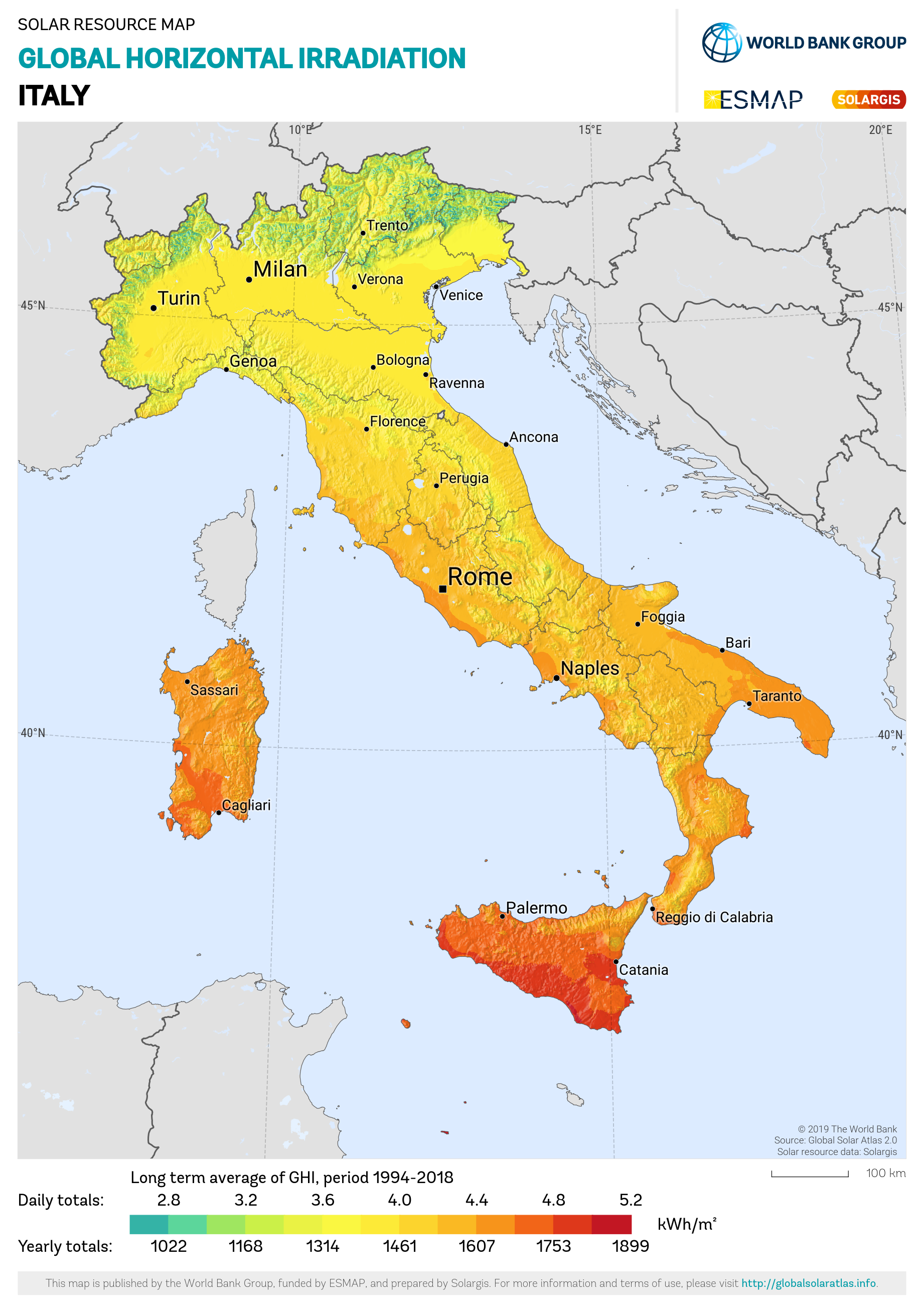
Solar potential

The entire nation of Italy retains high potential for solar energy production, ranging from 3.6 kWh per square meter per day in the Po river plain to 5.4 kWh per square meter per day in Sicily.

== Photovoltaics ==
=== Installed capacity ===
Installed capacity in Italy was less than 100 MW before 2008. Growth accelerated during 2008 and 2009 to reach over 1,000 MW installed capacity and tripled during 2010 to exceed 3,000 MW. The standout boom year in Italy was during 2011 when over 9,000 MW of solar power was added. This huge and rapid rise in installations was mostly due to the very generous "Conto Energia" support schemes operating during these years. A more responsive support scheme might have reduced support more quickly and led to less rapid growth during 2011 but stronger medium term growth.

By the end of the solar boom during 2011 Italy was second in the world in terms of installed capacity after Germany. Solar power accounted for 2.6% of electricity generated in the EU and 6.7% of electricity generated in Italy, the most in Europe. In 2011 Italy ranked first in installed solar power from new PV plants, with roughly four times the amount of power that was supplied in 2010. As of the end of 2010, there were 155,977 solar PV plants, with a total capacity of 3,469.9 MW. By the end of 2011 there were 330,196 installations, totalling 12,773 MW. Plants were increasing both in number and size as can be seen from the faster pace of growth of installed capacity compared with raw installation numbers.

Growth after 2011 slowed as the schemes were revised at sporadic intervals rather than timely interventions based on cost and deployment. In 2012 Italy added an estimated 3.4 GW of new capacity, a figure much reduced on 2011 but still a large rise in the context of solar development by that year. A 2013 report by Deutsche Bank concluded that solar power has already reached grid parity in Italy. With the ending of the Conto Energia schemes in July 2013 growth reduced considerably. Nevertheless, since 2014, annual capacity growth has remained consistent at around 2% per year or 300–400 MW per year to 2018. Much of this growth has been driven by residential solar PV, subject to tax allowances, representing 40–50 per cent of new capacity in the years 2017–2018 alone. In 2017 the first incentive-free solar power plant was installed, with a 63 MW capacity followed by others up to 30 MW in size in 2018. By the end of 2018, installed capacity in Italy exceeded the 20 GW milestone for the first time. As of 2018, solar PV accounts for 7.9% of electricity demand, making Italy a major leader in solar power generation and development. Solar installations have recently accelerated.

Solar PV yearly installation and total capacity since 2005 (MW)

Year	Capacity (MW_{p})	Generation (GWh)	Generation %	Consumption %	Ref
2006	37				
2007	87				
2008	432	200	0.1%		
2009	1,144	677	0.24%	0.21%	
2010	3,470	1,874	0.64%	0.57%	
2011	12,783	10,668	3.7%	3.2%	
2012	16,479	18,631	6.5%	5.7%	
2013	18,074	21,229	7.0%	6.7%	
2014	18,460	23,299	8.7%	7.5%	
2015	18,892	25,200	9.0%	8.5%	
2016	19,283	22,590	8.2%		
2017	19,700	24,811		6.9%	
2018	20,100	22,900		7.0%	
2019	20,871				
2020	21,623				
2021	22,560				
Data is taken from a variety of sources and may only be a good estimate for some years.

=== Electricity production from solar ===
Yearly electricity production from solar power
Year	Electricity generated from solar (in TWh)	Percentage of total electricity production
2007	0.04	0.01%
2008	0.19	0.06%
2009	0.68	0.24%
2010	1.91	0.64%
2011	10.8	3.62%
2012	18.86	6.39%
2013	21.59	7.55%
2014	22.31	8.07%
2015	22.94	8.20%
2016	22.1	7.73%
2017	24.38	8.35%
2018	22.65	7.92%
2019	23.69	8.17%
2020	24.94	9.01%
2021	25.04	8.77%
2022	28.12	10.04%
2023	30.71	11.74%
2024	35.99	13.45%
2025	44.63	16.86%

=== Future prospects ===
The "National Energy Strategy", SEN, published in 2017, and the "Proposal of an Integrated National Plan for Energy and Climate" (PNIEC), published in December 2018, outline a target of reaching 50 GW of solar PV installed power by 2030. This is part of a strategy to obtain 30% of gross final energy consumption from renewable sources by 2030, a measure including not only electrical energy but all energy consumed in Italy. A new decree for renewable sources is being awaited by the solar industry, which if adopted will support maintenance, re-powering and revamping of existing plants and new measures to benefit residential Solar PV.

=== Regional installations ===
Watts per capita by region in 2013: 1–10 W/inhabitant 10–50 watts 50–100 watts 100–200 watts / 200–350 watts 350–500 watts 500–750 watts >750 watts

More than a fifth of the total production in 2010 came from the southern region of Apulia. In 2011, 20% came from Apulia, followed by 10% from Emilia-Romagna. The annual energy production from solar PV in Italy ranges from 1,000 to 1,500 kWh per installed kWp.

=== Solar PV market segmentation ===
Installed PV capacity in Italy by class size 2017
<10 kW	19.6%
10–100 kW	20.9%
100–500 kW	37.8%
>500 kW	21.7%

Systems of less than 10 kW accounted for 19.6% of totalled installed capacity. These are single direct use systems, mostly residential solar pv systems. Systems rated 10–100 kW represented 20.9% of capacity and represents systems used collectively within one place such as a large residential block or large commercial premise or intensive agricultural units. The next class size of systems 100–500 kW may represent larger commercial centers, hospitals, schools or industrial / agricultural premises or smaller ground mounted systems. The final category of systems rated over 500 kW mostly represent district power systems, ground mounted panels providing power to perhaps a mix of industrial and commercial sites. It is interesting to note that whilst large power plants receive a lot of attention in solar power articles, installations under 0.5 MW in size actually represent nearly 80% of the installed capacity in Italy in 2017. Nearly all solar PV in Italy is grid connected, with just 14 MW being off-grid as of 2017.

Solar PV in Italy by type 2014	MW installed
BIPV	2,650
BAPV	7,125
PV (ground mounted)	8,650
CPV	30

Building integrated photovoltaic systems (BIPV) accounted for 2,650 MW of capacity in 2014. These are solar cells integrated into the building itself,such as construction materials, roof tiles and ceramic or glass facades. Building applied photovoltaic systems (BAPV) measured 7,125 MW, and are regular solar cell systems that are generally installed on top of roofs. Ground mounted PV totalled 8,650 MW, whilst concentrator photovoltaics (CPV) amounted to 30 MW; these use lenses or curved mirrors to focus sunlight onto small, highly efficient, multi-junction (MJ) solar cells.

==== Residential solar PV capacity ====
According to a report on behalf of the European Commission, Italy had 2,640 MW of residential solar PV capacity with 709,000 residential solar PV prosumers in the country representing 2.7% of households as of 2015. The average size of residential solar PV systems is estimated to be 3.73 kW moving to 2030. The technical potential for residential solar PV in Italy is estimated at 24,867 MW. The payback time for residential solar PV in Italy was six years as of 2015. Some of the advantages of small scale residential solar include eliminating the need for extra land, keeping cost saving advantages in local communities, and empowering households to become prosumers of renewable electricity, thus raising awareness of wasteful consumption habits and environmental issues through direct experience.

==== Largest PV power plants ====
Italy's largest photovoltaic (PV) power plants
Name of plant	Peak capacity (MW)	Production (GWh/year)	Capacity factor (%)	Start of operation
Troia solar farm	103	–	–	2019–2020
Montalto di Castro Photovoltaic Power Station	84.2	140	19	2009–2010
Rovigo Photovoltaic Power Plant	70.6	–	–	2010
Serenissima Solar Park	48	–	–	2011
Cellino San Marco Solar Park	43	56	14.9	2010
Alfonsine Solar Park	36.2	–	–	2010
Sant'Alberto Solar Park	34.6	–	–	2010
Su-Scioffu Greenhouse PV Park	20.0	–	–	2011
Anguillara PV power plant	15	–	–	2010
Priolo PV power plant	13.5	–	–	2010
Loreo PV power plant	12.6	–	–	2010
Craco PV power plant	12	–	–	2010
Manzano PV power plant	11	–	–	2010
Gamascia PV power plant	9.7	–	–	2010
Ragusa PV power plant	8.4	–	–	2010

== Energy policies ==
Government targets for renewable energy sources (RES) and different support schemes, especially for solar photovoltaics, resulted in an increase from 7.9% (2005) to 18.2% (2015) in total share of renewable energy in the total primary energy supply (TPES). 1.6% of the 18.2% renewables share is made up of solar energy. From 2005 to 2015 solar power has increased on average by 63.7% per year. The share of renewables in electricity generation has increased from 17.2% in 2005 to 40.2% in 2015, including 9.3% of solar power. This is the highest share of solar in electricity among International Energy Agency (IEA) countries. And the third-highest share of solar power in TPES.

=== Institutions ===
Important institutions that are responsible for energy policies, the promotion and development of renewable energy, energy efficiency, co-ordination and payment of incentives are the Ministry of Economic Development (MSE), the Ministry for the Environment, Land and Sea (MATTM), the Ministry of Agricultural, Food and Forestry Policies (MIPAAF), the Regulatory Authority for Energy, Networks and Environment (ARERA, formerly AEEGSI, Autorità per l‘Energia elettrica e il Gas), the Gestore Servizi Energetici (GSE), the National Agency for New Technologies, Energy and Sustainable Economic Development (ENEA) and Terna.

=== Policy ===
The Directive 2009/28/EC establishes a framework for promoting the use of renewable energy sources. According to this Directive, 17% of Italy's final energy consumption must be supplied by renewable sources in 2020. Italy's 2010 National Renewable Energy Action Plan (NREAP) identifies sectoral targets and how to achieve them. In the 2013 National Energy Strategy (NES), Italy established energy aims to achieve by 2020 that rises the 17% EU target for renewable energy in final energy consumption to 19% or 20%. Energy efficiency, but also renewable energies, plays an important role for this strategy.

=== Conto Energia (feed-in tariffs) ===
In 2005 the Italian government introduced the first feed-in tariffs (FIT) specifically for photovoltaics connected to the grid, the Conto Energia schemes. The payments for the schemes were designed to be made over a 20-year period and to incentivise both smaller and larger producers to invest in the installation of photovoltaic plants and systems. Between 2005 and 2013, five different Conto Energia schemes were introduced by ministerial decree. Each scheme had differing terms and conditions and tariffs provided to producers.

The following table provides a summary of the costs and the solar capacities installed under Conto Energia schemes 1-5:

	Conto Energia 1	Conto Energia 2	Conto Energia 3	Conto Energia 4	Conto Energia 5	Total
Date	28 July 2005 to 6 February 2006	19 February 2007	6 August 2010	5 May 2011	5 July 2012 Final scheme. Ended 6 July 2013.	
MW installed	163.4	6,791.2	1,566.6	7,600.4	2,094.9	18,216.6
Yearly cost (million Euro)	95.2	3,270.1	648.9	2,469.0	216.9	6,700.0
Yearly cost per kW installed (Euro, estimated)	582	482	414	325	104	368

The first Conto Energia resulted in the relatively small amount of 163 MW of new PV installations, perhaps because solar power was still in its infancy in 2005.

In 2007, the second Conto Energia resulted in a massive increase of 6,791 MW of new PVs at an annual cost of €3.27 billion, and was the most costly scheme. Almost half of the total cost of the schemes was accounted for by Conto Energia 2.

Conto Energia 3 ran briefly, resulting in 1,567 MW of installed power at an annual cost of €0.65 billion. This was succeeded by Conto Energia 4, which resulted in the largest increase in solar capacity so far at 7,600 MW of installed power at the annual cost of €2.47 billion.

The final Conto Energia 5 was introduced by ministerial decree in 2012. It was announced that the feed in tariff would end once the total annual costs of the cumulative Conto Energia scheme reached €6.7 billion. This figure was reached in 2013 and the final Conto Energia scheme was ended on 6 July 2013. The final scheme resulted in a further 2,095 MW of installed capacity at a cost of €0.22 billion. Under the Conto Energia incentive scheme, a total of 18,217 MW of installed solar PV power was added at annual cost of €6.7 billion.

=== Conto termico ===
In 2013, the support schemes changed and a new scheme, the conto termico, was introduced in the heat sector. This support scheme provides incentives for the installation of renewable heating and cooling systems, and for efficiencient refurbishments, including solar thermal systems. Receiving support from the scheme depends on type of intervention and is granted for two to five years, with the amount depending on expected energy production. Additional factors like greenhouse gases impact of different bioenergy technologies, also influence the support granted. The total annual support payments are capped at €200 million for public administrations and €700 million for privately owned entities.

There are also several other incentives like tax credits for photovoltaic systems and solar thermal energy plants. A net metering scheme supports RES-E producers with plant capacities between 20 kW and 500 kW.

=== Research and funding ===
In 2013, the government funded energy technology research, development and demonstration (RD&D) with €529 million. In recent years, other areas of the government budget were restructured. Between 2000 and 2013, nuclear research and development funding decreased from 40.7% to 18.2% in favour of energy efficiency and renewable energy, which grew from 13.8% to 21.5% in the same time period.

Concentrated solar energy technologies and photovoltaics are fields of active projects and research areas. ENEA has been researching on concentrated solar energy technologies since 2001 and introduced several innovations. The Archimede Project is one such developed project.

== Concentrated solar power ==
Italy currently maintains various concentrated solar power (CSP) projects. Concentrated solar power plants concentrate solar energy into single points of collection with, for instance, mirrors, to maximise energy capture. Four types of CSP technologies are currently available on the market. These include parabolic troughs, Fresnel mirrors, power towers, and solar dish collectors. The 15 MWt Archimede solar field is a thermal field at Priolo Gargallo near Syracuse. The plant was inaugurated on 14 July 2010, and continues to be operational in a solar field of 31,860 square meters. It is the first concentrated solar power plant to use molten salt for heat transfer and storage which is integrated with a combined-cycle gas facility. Upon generating thermal energy, two tanks are available to store thermal energy for up to 8 hours. The two other CSP systems are the ASE demo plant, which uses parabolic trough technology to focus solar energy, and the Rende-CSP plant, which uses Linear Fresnel reflector technology to focus solar energy to one point of fluidised storage consisting of oil.

Salerno based Magaldi Industries, partnered with University of Naples and National Research Council of Italy, pioneered a new form of CSP called Solar Thermoelectric Magaldi (STEM). The first plant of this type was pioneered in Sicily in 2016. This technology uses off-grid applications to produce 24-hour industrial scale power for mining sites and remote communities in Italy, other parts of Europe, Australia, Asia, North Africa and Latin America. STEM uses fluidised silica sand as a thermal storage and heat transfer medium for CSP systems. This fluidised bed benefits from a high thermal diffusivity and heat transfer coefficients, as well as high thermal capacity as a solid. The use of silica sand also lowers the cost of the CSP, and the facility aims to minimise pollution released during the production and operation of the system while producing 50–100 MWe with a storage capacity of 5–6 hours. STEM is the first CSP technology to use sand for thermal energy storage, and also allows for immediate use or storage of solar energy through a solar field made of heliostats. Such technology is especially effective in remote areas and can be easily coupled with fossil fuel plants to increase reliability of electricity supply. STEM was first applied commercially in Sicily in 2016.

== Companies ==
Major Solar Companies in Italy
Company name	Description
Tages Helios Technology	Founded in 2011, Helios Technology has three business lines Tages Capital LLP in London dealing with liquid alternatives, Tages Capital SGR in Milan dealing with renewable energy investment management, and Credito Fondiario in Rome.
Enel Green Power	Founded in 2008 and operating in Europe, Asia, the Americas, Oceania, and Africa, Enel Green Power develops and manages activities for the generation of energy from renewable sources.
RTR Energy	Founded in 2010, RTR Energy is an independent company that manages 134 solar plants throughout Italy.
EF Solare Italia	Established in 2015–16 as an equal joint venture between Enel Green Power and F2i, who has since acquired Enel's 50% stake, EF Solare Italia manages over 300 solar plants in 17 different regions in Italy.
GSF	Founded in 2008, GSF manages 179 solar plants in Apulia, Italy and 1 solar plant in Campania, Italy.
ForVEI	Specializing in acquiring renewable energy infrastructure assets in Europe, ForVEI is a joint venture between Foresight Group LLP and VEI Green Group.

== See also ==
- Renewable energy in Italy
