= Lillaz =

Coordinates: 45°36′28.62″N 7°21′20.16″E

- Frazione
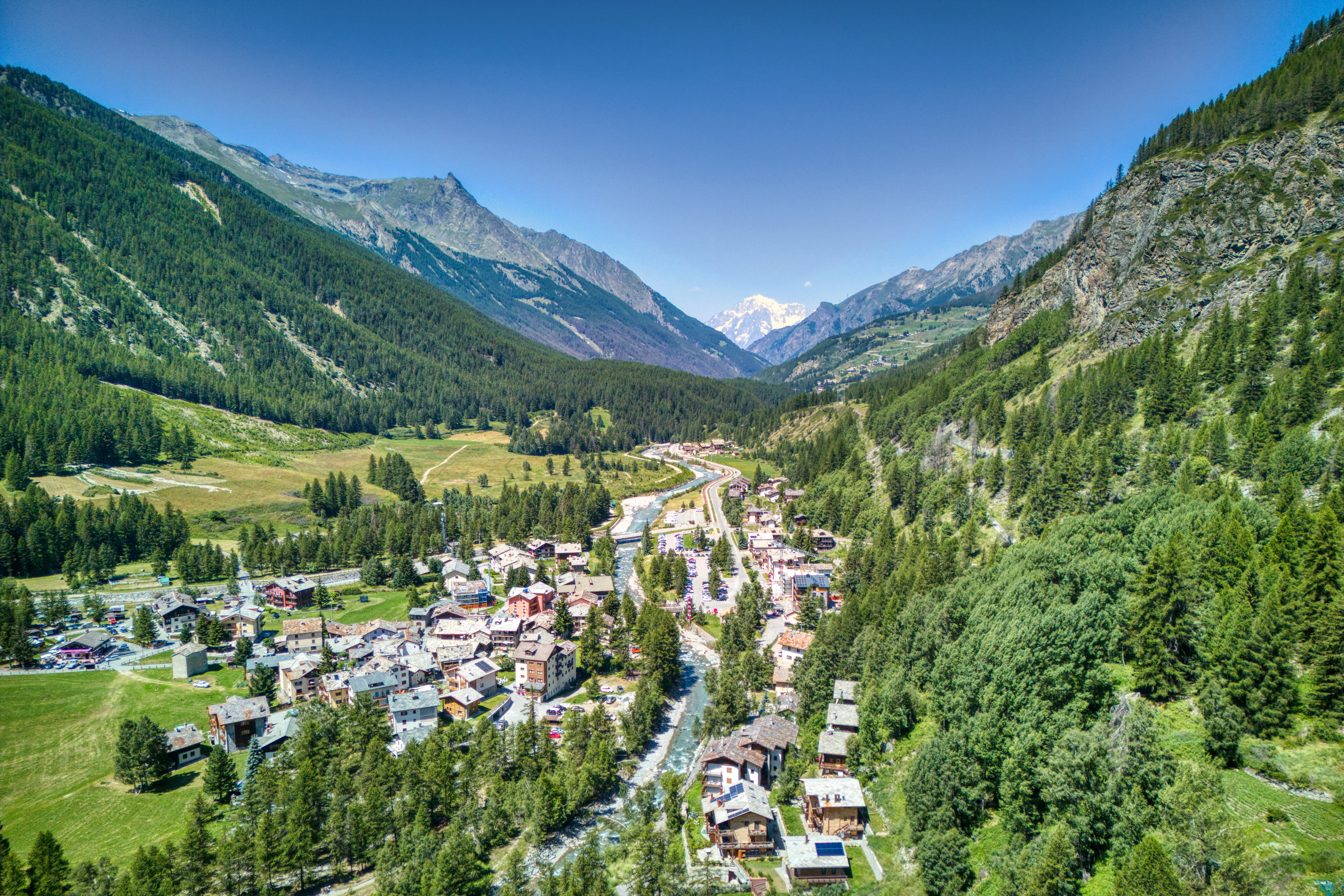
- Interactive map of Lillaz
- Country: Italy
- Region: Aosta Valley
- Province: Aosta
- Time zone: UTC+1 (CET)
  - Summer (DST): UTC+2 (CEST)

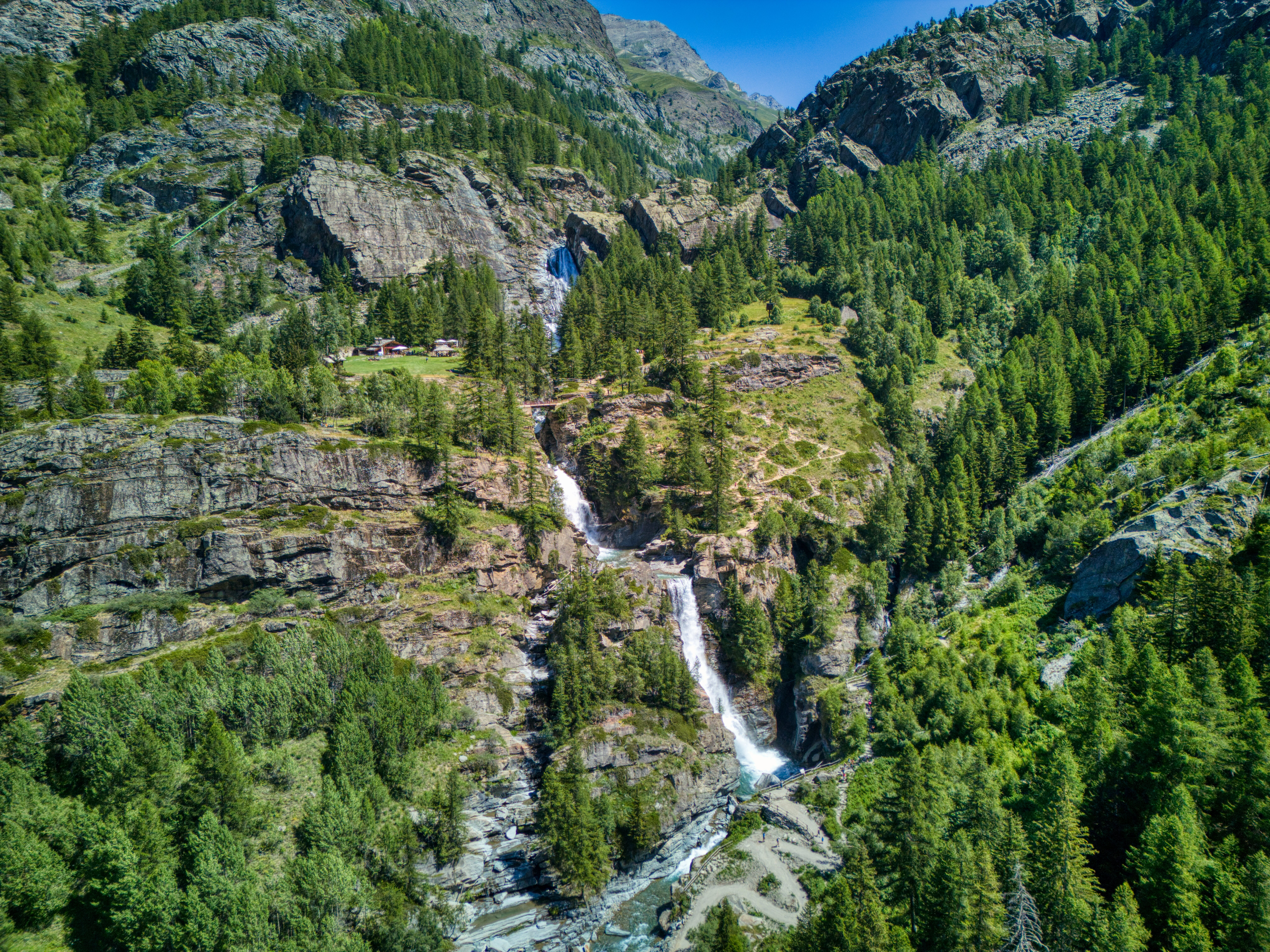
Lillaz Waterfalls

Lillaz is a frazione in the Province of Aosta in the Aosta Valley region of Italy.
