= Rovina =

Rovina may refer to:

== People ==
- Ilana Rovina, Israeli singer
- Hanna Rovina (1892–1980), Israeli actress
- Rovina Cai (born 1988) is an Australian artist
- Sixto Rovina, Netherlands Antilles international footballer

== Places ==
- Lago della Rovina or Lake Rovina, Italy
- Rovina, Bulgaria, a village in the municipality of Smolyan, Bulgaria
- Rovina, a village in Brănișca Commune, Hunedoara County, Romania
- Rovina, a village in Bucureșci Commune, Hunedoara County, Romania
