= Alfonsine Solar Park =

Solar park in Italy

- Official name: Parco Fotovoltaico Alfonsine
- Country: Italy
- Location: Alfonsine
- Coordinates: 44°34′N 11°59′E
- Status: Operational
- Commission date: 2010
- Construction cost: €85 million

Solar farm
- Type: Flat-panel PV
- Site area: 65 hectares (161 acres)

Power generation
- Nameplate capacity: 36.2 MW

Alfonsine Solar Park is a 36.2 MW solar photovoltaic (PV) plant in Northern Italy, near Alfonsine, Italy.

== See also ==
- List of photovoltaic power stations
- Montalto di Castro Photovoltaic Power Station
- Solar power in Italy
