= MIT Technology Review =

Magazine about technology

- Cover of 125th anniversary issue (September–October 2024)
- Editor-in-Chief: Mat Honan
- Categories: Science, technology
- Frequency: Bimonthly
- Circulation: 208,658
- Publisher: Elizabeth Bramson-Boudreau
- First issue: 1899; 127 years ago
- Company: MIT Technology Review
- Country: United States
- Based in: Cambridge, Massachusetts
- Language: English
- Website: technologyreview.com
- ISSN: 1099-274X

MIT Technology Review is a bimonthly magazine wholly owned by the Massachusetts Institute of Technology. It was founded in 1899 as The Technology Review, and was re-launched without the leading article in its name on April 23, 1998, under then publisher R. Bruce Journey. In September 2005, it was changed, under its then editor-in-chief and publisher, Jason Pontin, to a form resembling the historical magazine.

Before the 1998 re-launch, the editor stated that "nothing will be left of the old magazine except the name." It was therefore necessary to distinguish between the modern and the historical Technology Review. The historical magazine had been published by the MIT Alumni Association, was more closely aligned with the interests of MIT alumni, and had a more intellectual tone and much smaller public circulation. The magazine, billed from 1998 to 2005 as "MIT's Magazine of Innovation", and from 2005 onwards as simply "published by MIT", focused on new technology and how it is commercialized; was sold to the public and targeted at senior executives, researchers, financiers, and policymakers, as well as MIT alumni.

In 2011, Technology Review received an Utne Reader Independent Press Award for Best Science/Technology Coverage.

== History ==
=== Original magazine: 1899–1998 ===
Technology Review was founded in 1899 under the name The Technology Review and relaunched in 1998 without "The" in its original name. It currently claims to be "the oldest technology magazine in the world."

In 1899, The New York Times commented:

We give a cordial welcome to No. 1 of Vol. I of The Technology Review, a Quarterly Magazine Relating to the Massachusetts Institute of Technology, published in Boston, and under charge of the Association of Class Secretaries. As far as make-up goes, cover, paper, typography and illustrations are in keeping with the strong characteristics of the Institution it represents. This magazine, as its editors announce, is intended to be "a clearing house of information and thought," and, as far as the Institute of Technology is concerned, "to increase its power, to minimize its waste, to insure [sic] among its countless friends the most perfect co-operation."

The career path of James Rhyne Killian illustrates the close ties between Technology Review and the Institute. In 1926, Killian graduated from college and got his first job as assistant managing editor of Technology Review; he rose to editor-in-chief; became executive assistant to then-president Karl Taylor Compton in 1939; vice-president of MIT in 1945; and succeeded Compton as president in 1949.

The May 4, 1929, issue contained an article by Dr. Norbert Wiener, then Assistant Professor of Mathematics, describing some deficiencies in a paper Albert Einstein had published earlier that year. Wiener also commented on a cardinal's critique of the Einstein theory saying:

The pretended incomprehensibility of the Einstein theory has been used as capital by professional anti-Einsteinians. Without prejudice to the cause of religion, I may remark that theological discussions have not at all times been distinguished by their character of lucidity.

The historical Technology Review often published articles that were controversial, or critical of certain technologies. A 1980 issue contained an article by Jerome Wiesner attacking the Reagan administration's nuclear defense strategy. The cover of a 1983 issue stated, "Even if the fusion program produces a reactor, no one will want it," and contained an article by Lawrence M. Lidsky, associate director of MIT's Plasma Fusion Center, challenging the feasibility of fusion power (which at the time was often fancied to be just around the corner). The May 1984 issue contained an exposé about microchip manufacturing hazards.

In 1966, the magazine started using a puzzle column started in Tech Engineering News a few months earlier. Its author is Allan Gottlieb, who has now written the column for more than fifty years.

As late as 1967, the New York Times described Technology Review as a "scientific journal." Of its writing style, writer George V. Higgins complained:

Technology Review, according to [then-editor] Stephen [sic] Marcus... [subjects] its scientific contributors to rewrite rigors that would give fainting spells to the most obstreperous cub reporter. Marcus believes this produces readable prose on arcane subjects. I don't agree.

In 1984, Technology Review printed an article about a Russian scientist using ova from frozen mammoths to create a mammoth-elephant hybrid called a "mammontelephas". Apart from being dated "April 1, 1984", there were no obvious giveaways in the story. The Chicago Tribune News Service picked it up as a real news item, and it was printed as fact in hundreds of newspapers.

In 1994, a survey of "opinion leaders" ranked Technology Review No. 1 in the nation in the "most credible" category.

Contributors to the magazine also included Thomas A. Edison, Winston Churchill, and Tim Berners-Lee.

=== Relaunch: 1998–2005 ===
A radical transition of the magazine occurred in 1996. At that time, according to the Boston Business Journal, in 1996 Technology Review had lost $1.6 million over the previous seven years and was "facing the possibility of folding" due to "years of declining advertising revenue."

R. Bruce Journey was named publisher, the first full-time publisher in the magazine's history. According to previous publisher William J. Hecht, although Technology Review had "long been highly regarded for its editorial excellence," the purpose of appointing Journey was to enhance its "commercial potential" and "secure a prominent place for Technology Review in the competitive world of commercial publishing." John Benditt replaced Steven J. Marcus as editor-in-chief, the entire editorial staff was fired, and the modern Technology Review was born.

Boston Globe columnist David Warsh described the transition by saying that the magazine had been serving up "old 1960s views of things: humanist, populist, ruminative, suspicious of the unseen dimensions of new technologies" and had now been replaced with one that "takes innovation seriously and enthusiastically." Former editor Marcus characterized the magazine's new stance as "cheerleading for innovation."

Under Bruce Journey, Technology Review billed itself as "MIT's Magazine of Innovation". Since 2001, it has been published by Technology Review Inc., a nonprofit independent media company owned by MIT.

Intending to appeal to business leaders, editor John Benditt said in 1999, "We're really about new technologies and how they get commercialized." Technology Review covers breakthroughs and current issues on fields such as biotechnology, nanotechnology, and computing. Articles are also devoted to more mature disciplines such as energy, telecommunications, transportation, and the military.

Since Journey, Technology Review has been distributed as a regular mass-market magazine and appears on newsstands. By 2003, circulation had more than tripled from 92,000 to 315,000, about half that of Scientific American, and included 220,000 paid subscribers and 95,000 sent free to MIT alumni. Additionally, in August 2003, a German edition of Technology Review was started in cooperation with the publishing house Heinz Heise (circulation of about 50,000 as of 2005). According to The New York Times, as of 2004 the magazine was still "partly financed by M.I.T. (though it is expected to turn a profit eventually)."

Technology Review also functions as the MIT alumni magazine; the edition sent to alumni contains a separate section, "MIT News," containing items such as alumni class notes. This section is not included in the edition distributed to the general public.

The magazine is published by Technology Review, Inc, an independent media company owned by MIT. MIT's website lists it as an MIT publication, and the MIT News Office states that "the magazine often uses MIT expertise for some of its content." In 1999 The Boston Globe noted that (apart from the alumni section) "few Technology Review articles actually concern events or research at MIT." However, in the words of editor Jason Pontin:

Our job is not to promote MIT; but we analyse and explain emerging technologies, and because we believe that new technologies are, generally speaking, a good thing, we do indirectly promote MIT's core activity: that is, the development of innovative technology.

From 1997 to 2005, R. Bruce Journey held the title of "publisher"; Journey was also the president and CEO of Technology Review, Inc. Editors-in-chief have included John Benditt (1997), Robert Buderi (2002), and Jason Pontin (2004).

The magazine has won numerous Folio! awards, presented at the annual magazine publishing trade show conducted by Folio! magazine. In 2001, these included a "Silver Folio: Editorial Excellence Award" in the consumer science and technology magazine category and many awards for typography and design. In 2006, Technology Review was named a finalist in the "general excellence" category of the annual National Magazine Awards, sponsored by the American Society of Magazine Editors.

On June 6, 2001, Fortune and CNET Networks launched a publication entitled Fortune/CNET Technology Review. MIT sued Fortune's parent corporation, Time, Inc. for infringement of the Technology Review trademark. The case was quickly settled. In August the MIT student newspaper reported that lawyers for MIT and Time were reluctant to discuss the case, citing a confidentiality agreement that both sides described as very restrictive. Jason Kravitz, a Boston attorney who represented MIT in the case, suggested that the magazine's change of name to Fortune/CNET Tech Review, a change that occurred in the middle of the case, may have been part of the settlement.

Many publications covering specific technologies have used "technology review" as part of their names, such as Lawrence Livermore Labs's Energy & Technology Review, AACE's Educational Technology Review, and the International Atomic Energy Agency's Nuclear Technology Review.

The magazine adopted a more serious tone in a 2004 redesign.

In 2005, Technology Review, along with Wired News and other technology publications, was embarrassed by the publication of a number of stories by freelancer Michelle Delio containing information which could not be corroborated. Editor-in-chief Pontin said, "Of the ten stories which were published, only three were entirely accurate. In two of the stories, I'm fairly confident that Michelle Delio either did not speak to the person she said she spoke to, or misrepresented her interview with him." The stories were retracted.

=== Modern magazine: 2005–present ===
On August 30, 2005, Technology Review announced that R. Bruce Journey, publisher from 1996 to 2005, would be replaced by the then current Editor in Chief, Jason Pontin, and would reduce the print publication frequency from eleven to six issues per year while enhancing the publication's website. The Boston Globe characterized the change as a "strategic overhaul." Editor and publisher Jason Pontin stated that he would "focus the print magazine on what print does best: present[ing] longer-format, investigative stories and colorful imagery." Technology Review's Web site, Pontin said, would henceforth publish original, daily news and analysis (whereas before it had merely republished the print magazine's stories). Finally, Pontin said that Technology Review's stories in print and online would identify and analyze emerging technologies. This focus resembles that of the historical Technology Review. Pontin convinced copy editors to adopt the diaeresis mark for words like "coördinate", a rarity in native English usage, though failed to convince them to use logical punctuation.

Without evident comment, the July/August, 2017, issue revealed a shift in top personnel, with Elizabeth Bramson-Boudreau listed as Chief Executive Officer and Publisher, and David Rotman as Editor. Gideon Lichfield was named editor-in-chief in November 2017.

In 2020, the Brazilian version of MIT Technology Review, known as MIT Technology Review Brasil, was launched.

In 2021, Mat Honan, formerly of BuzzFeed News and WIRED was named editor in chief.

The magazine, like many others has transitioned its focus from print to digital.

Every year, the magazine publishes a list of the 10 technologies it considers the most influential.

== Annual lists ==
Each year, MIT Technology Review publishes several annual lists:

- Innovators Under 35 (formerly TR35)
- 10 Breakthrough Technologies
- 10 Climate Tech Companies to Watch
- 10 Things that Matter in AI

=== Innovators Under 35 ===
MIT Technology Review has become well known for its annual Innovators Under 35. In 1999, and then in 2002—2004, MIT Technology Review produced the TR100, a list of "100 remarkable innovators under the age of 35." In 2005, this list was renamed the TR35 and shortened to 35 individuals under the age of 35. Notable recipients of the award include Google co-founders Larry Page and Sergey Brin, PayPal co-founder Max Levchin, Geekcorps creator Ethan Zuckerman, Linux developer Linus Torvalds, BitTorrent developer Bram Cohen, MacArthur "genius" bioengineer Jim Collins, investors Micah Siegel and Steve Jurvetson, and Netscape co-founder Marc Andreessen. The list was renamed Innovators Under 35 in 2013.

== Recognition ==
In 2006, Technology Review was a finalist in the National Magazine Awards in the category of General Excellence.

In 2007, Technology Review won third place in the Magazine Publishers of America (MPA) Digital Awards for best business or news Website and second place for best online video or video series. In 2008, Technology Review won third place in the MPA Digital Awards for best online videos.

In 2011, Technology Review was recognized for the best science and technology coverage in the Utne Reader Independent Press Awards.

== Other languages ==
MIT Technology Review has international editions in Italy, Spain, Germany, Brazil, China, Japan and Korea.

== See also ==
- Citizen Science (The OED cites an article from the MIT Technology Review in January 1989 as the first use of the term 'citizen science'.)
