= Serenissima Solar Park =

Photovoltaic (PV) plant in Northeast Italy

- Country: Italy
- Location: Canaro
- Coordinates: 44°56′35″N 11°39′12″E
- Status: Operational
- Commission date: August 2011
- Owner: BNP Clean Energy Partners

Solar farm
- Type: Flat-panel PV
- Site area: 150 hectares Footprint

Power generation
- Units operational: 127,660
- Nameplate capacity: 48 MW

Serenissima Solar Park is a 48 MW photovoltaic (PV) plant in Northeast Italy. The construction schedule was shortened by several months to meet the August 31, 2011 deadline to receive the FIT rate of EUR 0.256/kWh (USD 0.364/kWh).

On April 2, 2012, S.A.G. Solarstrom AG sold the solar park to BNP Clean Energy Partners.

== See also ==
- List of photovoltaic power stations
- Montalto di Castro Photovoltaic Power Station
- Solar power in Italy
