= Lago della Piastra =

Lake in Italy

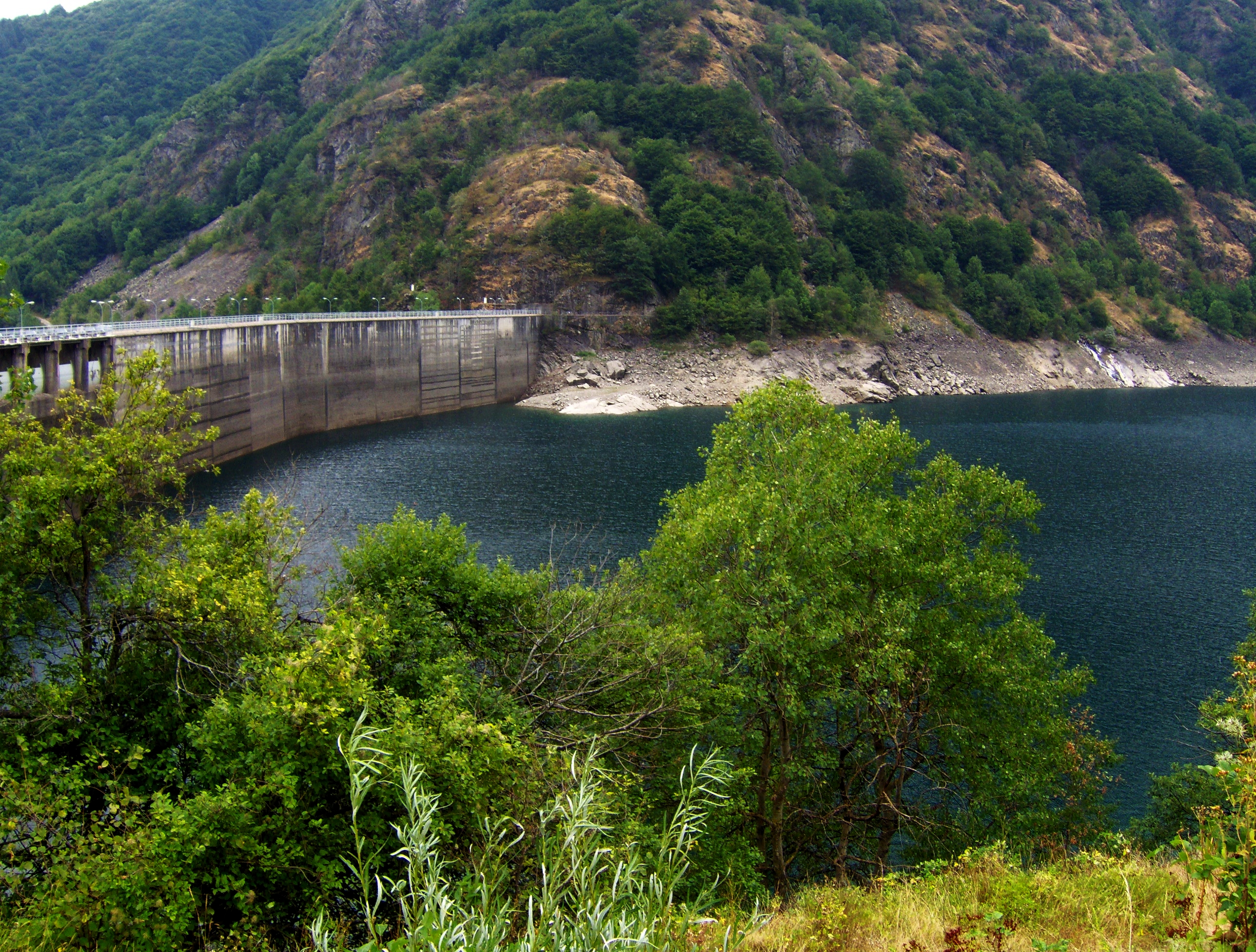

- Location within Piedmont
- Location: Province of Cuneo, Piedmont
- Coordinates: 44°13′19″N 7°23′20″E
- Primary inflows: Torrente Gesso di San Giacomo
- Basin countries: Italy
- Water volume: 12,000,000 m^{3} (9,700 acre⋅ft)
- Surface elevation: 956 m (3,136 ft)

Lago della Piastra is a lake in the Province of Cuneo, Piedmont, Italy. It is used as the lower reservoir for the pumped-storage hydroelectric Entracque Power Plant.
