= Archimede combined cycle power plant =

Power Plant in Sicily

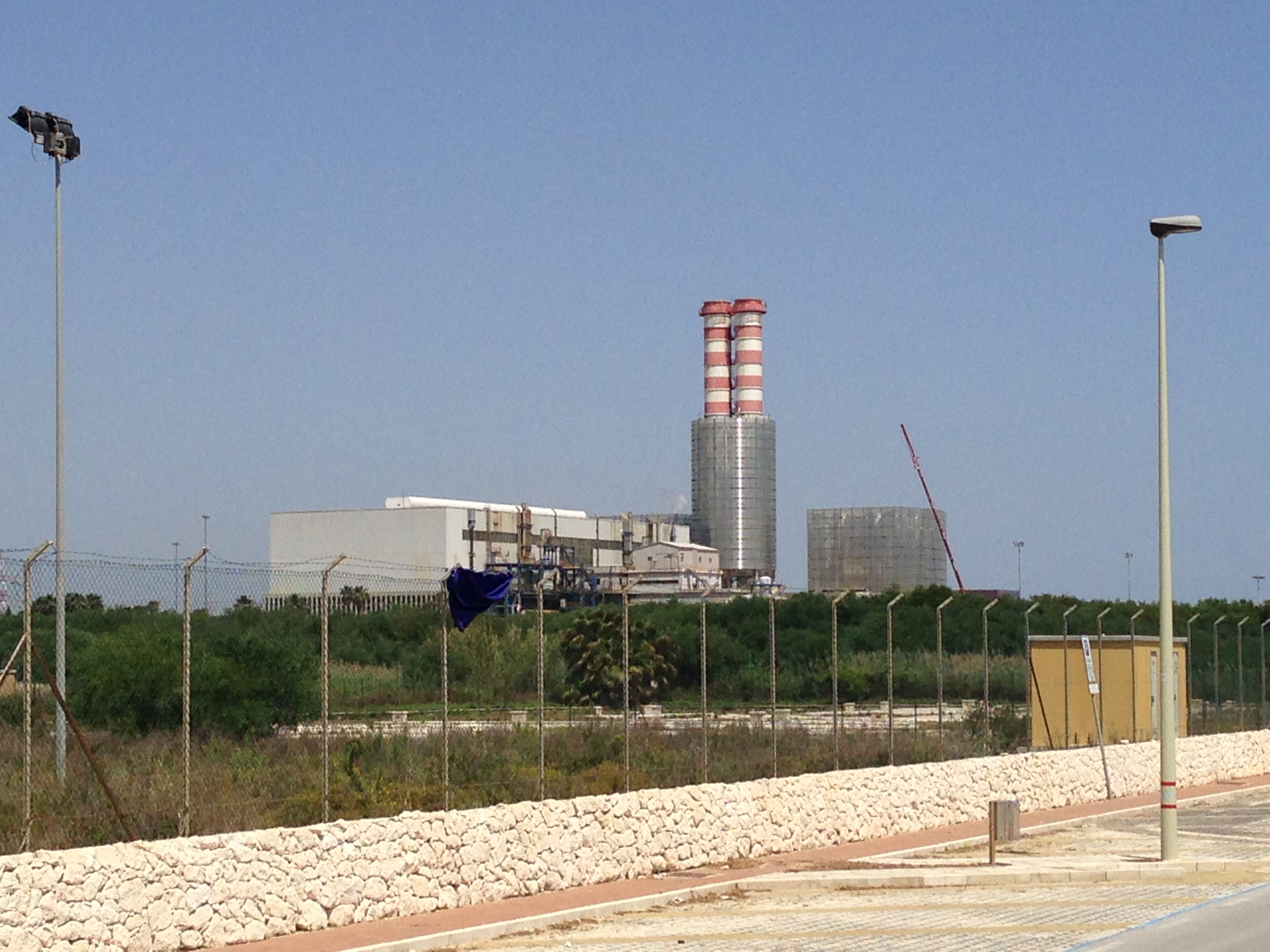
- Official name: Centrale a ciclo combinato Archimede
- Country: Italy
- Location: Priolo Gargallo, Syracuse
- Coordinates: 37°8′0″N 15°12′58″E
- Status: Operational
- Commission date: 2003 (combined cycle station); 2010 (solar field)
- Owner: Enel

Solar farm
- Type: CSP
- CSP technology: Parabolic trough
- Total collector area: 30,000 square metres (320,000 sq ft)
- Site resource: 1,936 kWh/m^{2}/yr

Thermal power station
- Primary fuel: Natural gas
- Secondary fuel: Solar
- Site area: 11 hectares (27 acres)
- Cooling source: Ionian Sea
- Combined cycle?: Yes
- Thermal capacity: 15 MW_{th} (solar field alone)

Power generation
- Units operational: 2 × 257 MW; 1 × 122 MW
- Make and model: 2 × Siemens V94 3/A; 1 × steam turbine
- Nameplate capacity: 636 MW
- Storage capacity: 15 MW·h_{th}

External links
- Commons: Related media on Commons

Archimede combined cycle power plant (also known as Centrale a ciclo combinato Archimede, once Centrale Enel Priolo Gargallo) is an integrated solar combined cycle (ISCC) power generation plant at Priolo Gargallo near Syracuse in Sicily, Italy. The combine cycle section was inaugurated in 2003, and the solar field on 14 July 2010. The solar field is the first to use molten salt for heat transfer and storage which is integrated with the combined-cycle gas facility. It uses technology developed by ENEA and Archimede Solar Energy, a joint venture between Angelantoni Industrie and Siemens Energy. Archimede is owned and operated by Enel.

The plant is called "Archimedes" (the famous resident of the nearby Magna Graecia Hellenistic city of Syracuse) after the rows of huge parabolic mirrors used to capture the sun's rays, which recall the "burning mirrors" that Archimedes is said to have used to set fire to the Roman ships besieging Syracuse during the Siege of Syracuse (214–212 BC). The existing gas-fired power plant is on about a 25 hectares (62 acres) site area (excluding the solar field), and is augmented by the 11 hectares (27 acres) Archimede solar field.

== Description ==
=== Combined cycle section ===
There are two Siemens V94 3/A gas turbine groups with 257 MW_{e} net alternator each. The gas turbine discharge, outgoing 588 °C (1,090 °F), produce steam, through a so-called HRSG (Heat recovery steam generator) which then feeds a steam turbine group (with high, medium and low pressure turbines) driving a 122 MW_{e} net alternator. The solar component integrates the steam production of the gas turbines through a SSG (Solar Steam Generator), up to a maximum of 15 MW_{th} (thermal net power), in conditions of maximum insolation. The HSRG-1 and HSRG-2 operate in parallel with the SSG, shortly before entering steam turbine group. This means that every unit of thermal energy coming from the solar field delivers electricity only in accordance with the coefficient of efficiency of the steam section, not being involved in the gas turbines. The overall efficiency of the combined cycle turns out to be 56%, much less the steam section alone.

=== Solar field section ===
Archimede project system

At first, the solar field was planned larger but in the end it consists of a field of about 30,000 square metres (320,000 sq ft) of mirrors (the parabolic collectors) that concentrate sunlight onto 5,400 metres (17,700 ft) of pipe carrying the molten salt fluid. Molten salt is used as the heat transfer fluid in solar field and is heated to 550 °C (1,022 °F). The thermal energy is then stored in a hot tank and is used to produce high pressure steam to run steam turbines for electricity generation, reducing the consumption of fossil fuels and, as a result, enhancing the environmental performance of the combined-cycle plant. The solar collectors (the parabolic mirrors and pipes or receivers), together with a steam generator and two heat storage tanks – one cold and one hot – make up the solar portion of the system.

When the sun shines, the thermal fluid drawn from the cold tank is circulated through the network of parabolic collectors, where it is heated to a temperature of 550 °C (1,022 °F) and injected into the hot tank, where the thermal energy is stored. The fluid is then drawn from the hot reservoir to produce steam at high pressure and temperature, which is sent to Enel's nearby combined-cycle plant, where it contributes to electricity generation.

This system enables the solar field to generate steam at any time of the day and in all weather conditions until the stored thermal energy is depleted. Steam from the solar field may be used to heat the steam turbine group before start-up, or to keep it warm for a faster start-up and less mechanical stress.

The addition of the solar plant to the power station should reduce the amount of gas burnt at the plant and cut carbon dioxide emissions by 7,300 tonnes.

The solar field is relatively small, being less than half of the area dedicated solely to the conventional power plant section.

== See also ==
- List of solar thermal power stations
