= Roncovalgrande Hydroelectric Plant =

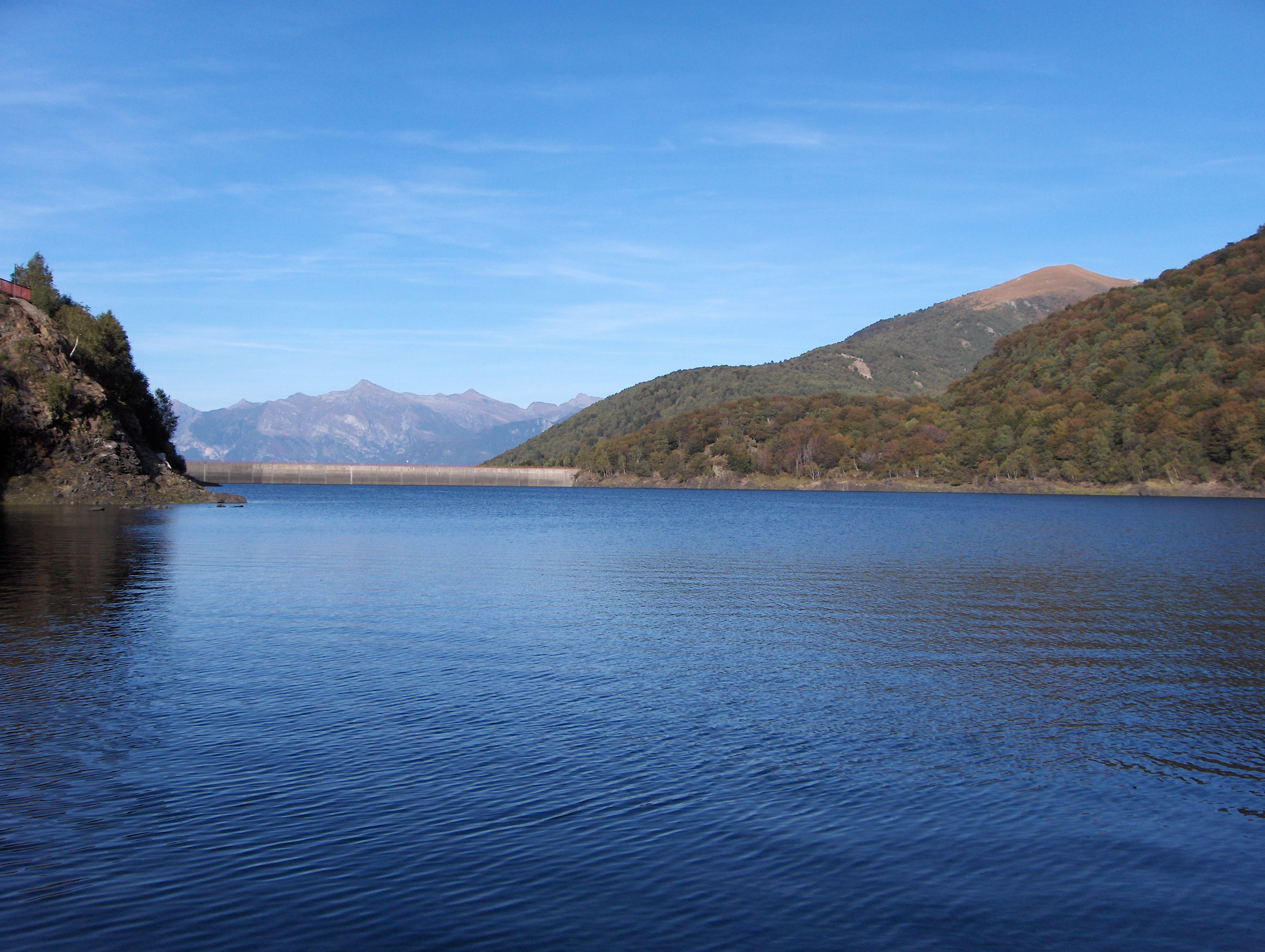
- Lago Delio, the upper reservoir
- Country: Italy
- Location: Maccagno
- Coordinates: 46°4′10″N 8°43′55″E
- Status: Operational
- Opening date: 1973
- Owner(s): ENEL

Upper reservoir
- Creates: Lago Delio
- Total capacity: 11,200,000 m^{3} (9,080 acre⋅ft)

Lower reservoir
- Creates: Lago Maggiore
- Total capacity: 39,000,000,000 m^{3} (31,617,815 acre⋅ft)

Power Station
- Hydraulic head: 736.25 m (2,415.5 ft)
- Turbines: 4 x 126.8 MW (170,000 hp) 4-stage Pelton-type, 4 x 127.32 MW (170,740 hp) MW 4-stage Pelton-type
- Pumps: 4
- Installed capacity: 1,016 MW (1,362,000 hp)
- Annual generation: 983.48 GWh (3,540.5 TJ)

The Roncovalgrande Hydroelectric Plant, also known as the Delio Hydroelectric Plant, is located 3 kilometres (1.9 mi) north of Maccagno in the Province of Varese, Lombardy, Italy. Using the pumped-storage hydroelectric method, the power plant has an installed capacity of 1,016 megawatts (1,362,000 hp). The power plant was complete in 1971 and the last generator operational in 1973. During construction, the upper reservoir, Lago Delio, was expanded in capacity with two gravity dams; a northern and southern, 28.5 metres (94 ft) and 36 metres (118 ft) in height, respectively. The lower reservoir, Lago Maggiore, already existed. The power plant itself is located underground in between Delio and Maggiore. To produce electricity, water is released from the upper reservoir to the power plant via two 1,100 metres (3,600 ft) long penstocks. At the power plant, eight four-stage Pelton turbine-generators generate electricity. Power generation occurs during periods of high energy demand and when energy demand is low, pumping usually occurs. The pumps are on the same shaft as the Pelton turbines and send water from the lower to the upper reservoir to serve as stored energy. Later on, this water will be sent back down to the power station and the process will repeat. The difference in elevation between the upper and lower reservoirs affords a hydraulic head of 736.25 m (2,416 ft) and Lago Delio has a usable storage capacity of 10,000,000 cubic metres (8,100 acre⋅ft).

== See also ==
- Hydroelectricity in Italy
- List of pumped-storage hydroelectric power stations
