= Entracque Power Plant =

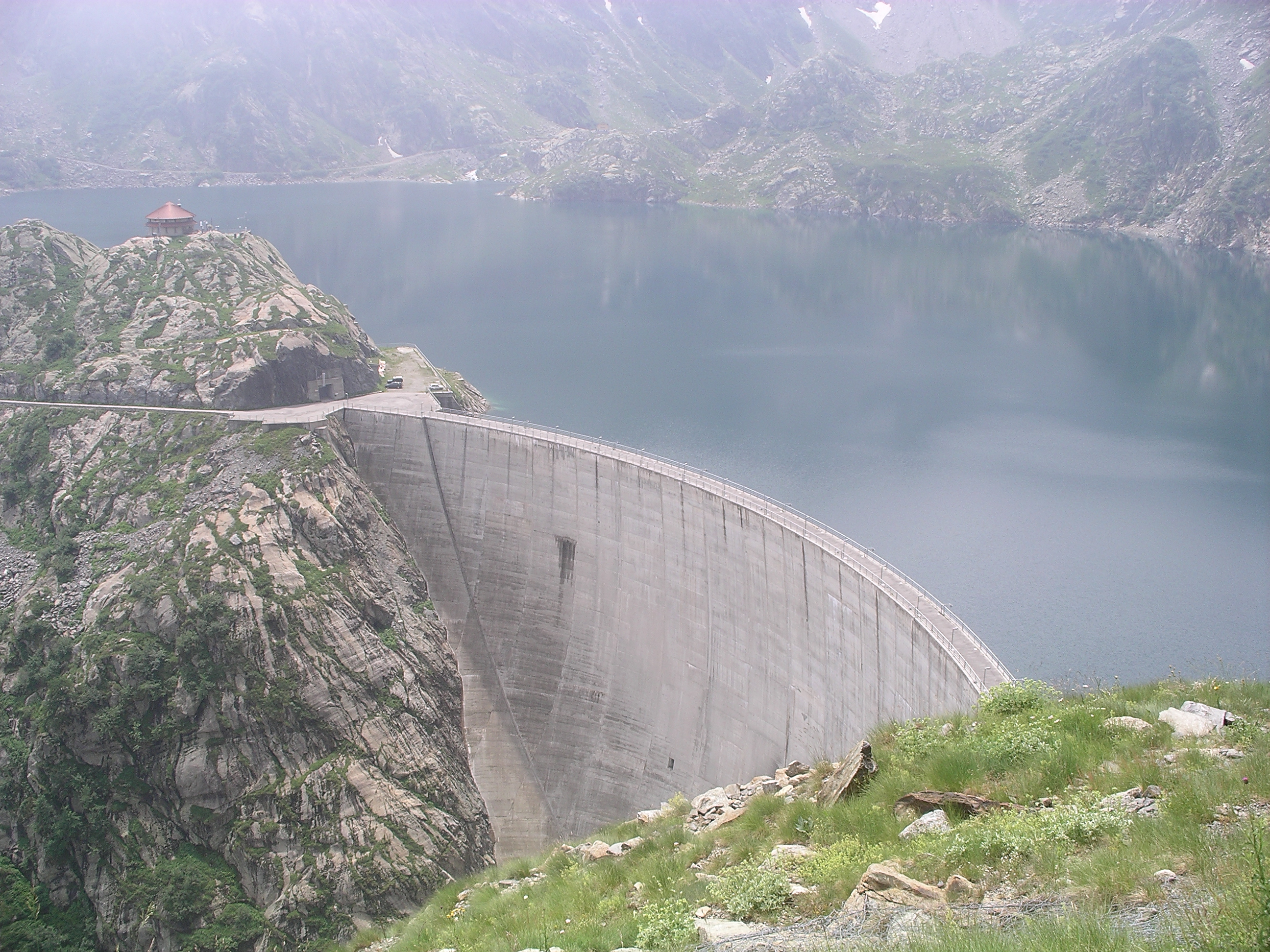
- The Chiotas Dam
- Official name: Centrale Idroelettrica Entracque
- Country: Italy
- Location: Entracque
- Coordinates: 44°13′29″N 07°23′10″E
- Status: Operational
- Construction began: 1969
- Opening date: 1982
- Owner(s): Enel

Upper reservoir
- Creates: Chiotas Plant: Lago del Chiotas; Rovina Plant: Lago della Rovina
- Total capacity: Chiotas Plant total:30,200,000 m^{3} (24,484 acre⋅ft) Chiotas active: 27,300,000 m^{3} (22,132 acre⋅ft) (active (usable)); Rovina: 1,200,000 m^{3} (973 acre⋅ft) (active (usable))

Lower reservoir
- Creates: Lago della Piastra
- Total capacity: Total: 12,000,000 m^{3} (9,700 acre⋅ft); Active: 9,000,000 m^{3} (7,300 acre⋅ft)

Power Station
- Hydraulic head: Chiotas: 1,048 m (3,438 ft); Rovina: 598 m (1,962 ft)
- Pump-generators: Chiotas: 8 x 148 MW (198,000 hp) Francis-pump turbine Rovina: 1 x 133.67 MW (179,250 hp) Francis-pump turbine
- Installed capacity: Chiotas: 1,184 MW (1,588,000 hp) MW; Rovina Plant: 133.67 MW; Total: 1,317.67 MW (1,767,020 hp)
- Annual generation: Chiotas: 1,040 GWh (3,700 TJ)

The Entracque Power Plant, also known as The Upper Gesso Plant, is a pumped-storage hydroelectric power station located in Valle Gesso just south of Entracque, Italy. The power station contains pump-generators for two co-located but hydraulically separated power schemes; the Chiotas-Piastra Plant and Rovina-Piastra Plant. Both plants use separate upper reservoirs but use Lago della Piastra as their common lower reservoir. To produce power, water is released from the upper reservoirs to the power station located at the lower reservoir. The pump-generators re-fill the reservoirs and the process repeats as needed. The Chiotas' upper reservoir, Lago del Chiotas, is located much higher in the valley and larger than Rovina's Lago della Rovina which affords it the ability to produce more electricity. The installed capacity of Chiotas is 1,184 megawatts (1,588,000 hp) with a hydraulic head (water drop in elevation) of 1,048 m (3,438 ft) while Rovina has an installed capacity of 133.67 megawatts (179,250 hp) and a head of 598 metres (1,962 ft). Construction on the plant began in 1962 and operations started in 1982. It is owned and operated by Enel.

== Design and operation ==
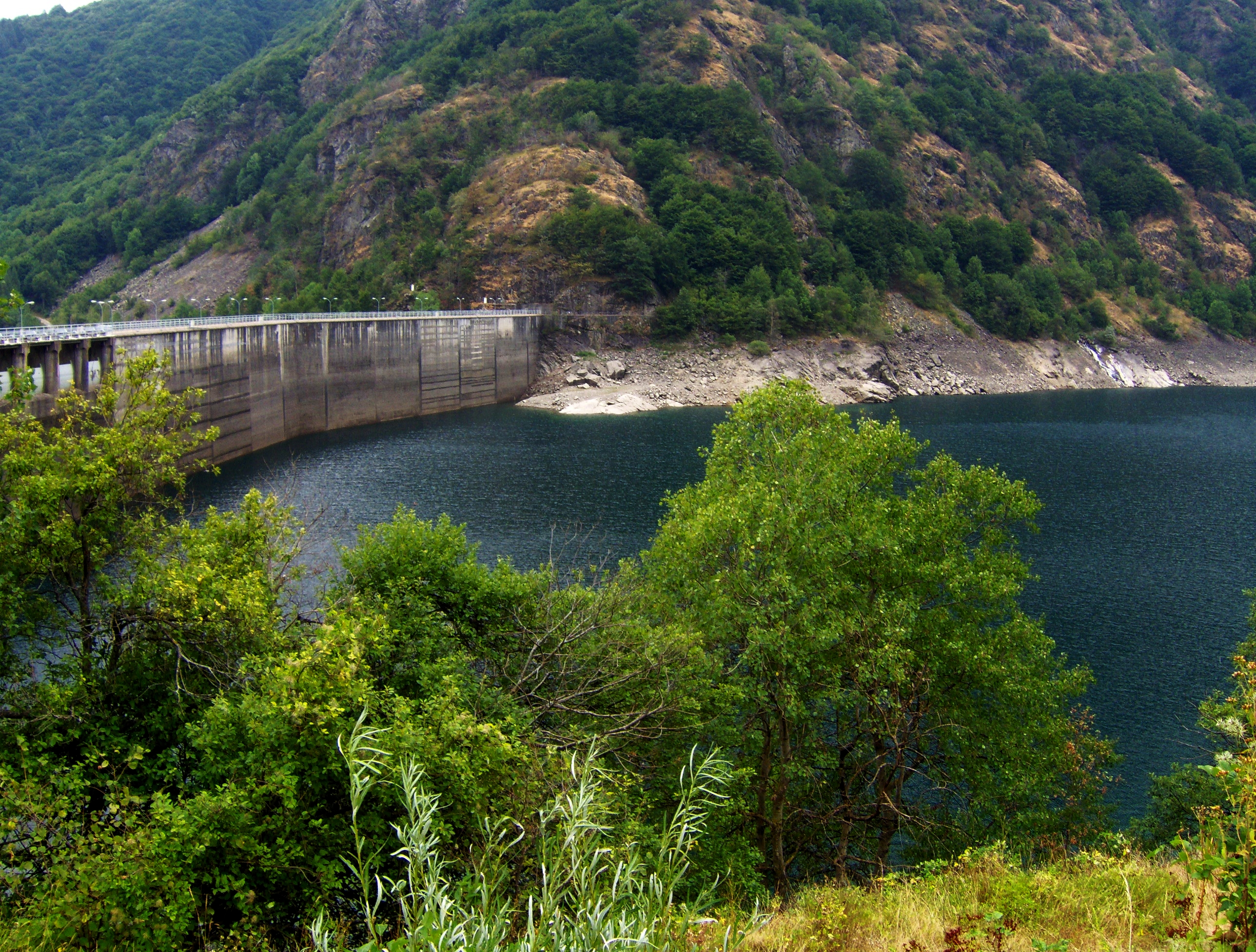
The Piastra Dam and Lago della Piastra

The Entracque Power Plant is supported by a scheme that also primarily consists of three reservoirs. The lower reservoir used by both the Chiotas and Rovina is Lago della Piastra. The reservoir is located at the base of the valley and was formed by the construction of an 88-metre (289 ft) tall gravity dam. Its water level has a normal operating elevation of 956 metres (3,136 ft) and 9,000,000 cubic metres (7,300 acre⋅ft) of its total 12,000,000 cubic metres (9,700 acre⋅ft) storage capacity can be pumped up to the upper reservoirs. The pumping is carried out by the power station's nine Francis pump turbine-generators, eight belong to Chiotas and one to Rovina. When either of the upper reservoirs needs to be filled, water is pumped from Piastra to the Chiotas or Rovina upper reservoirs through a series of penstocks and tunnels. This usually occurs during periods of low energy demand, such as at night, when electricity is cheap.

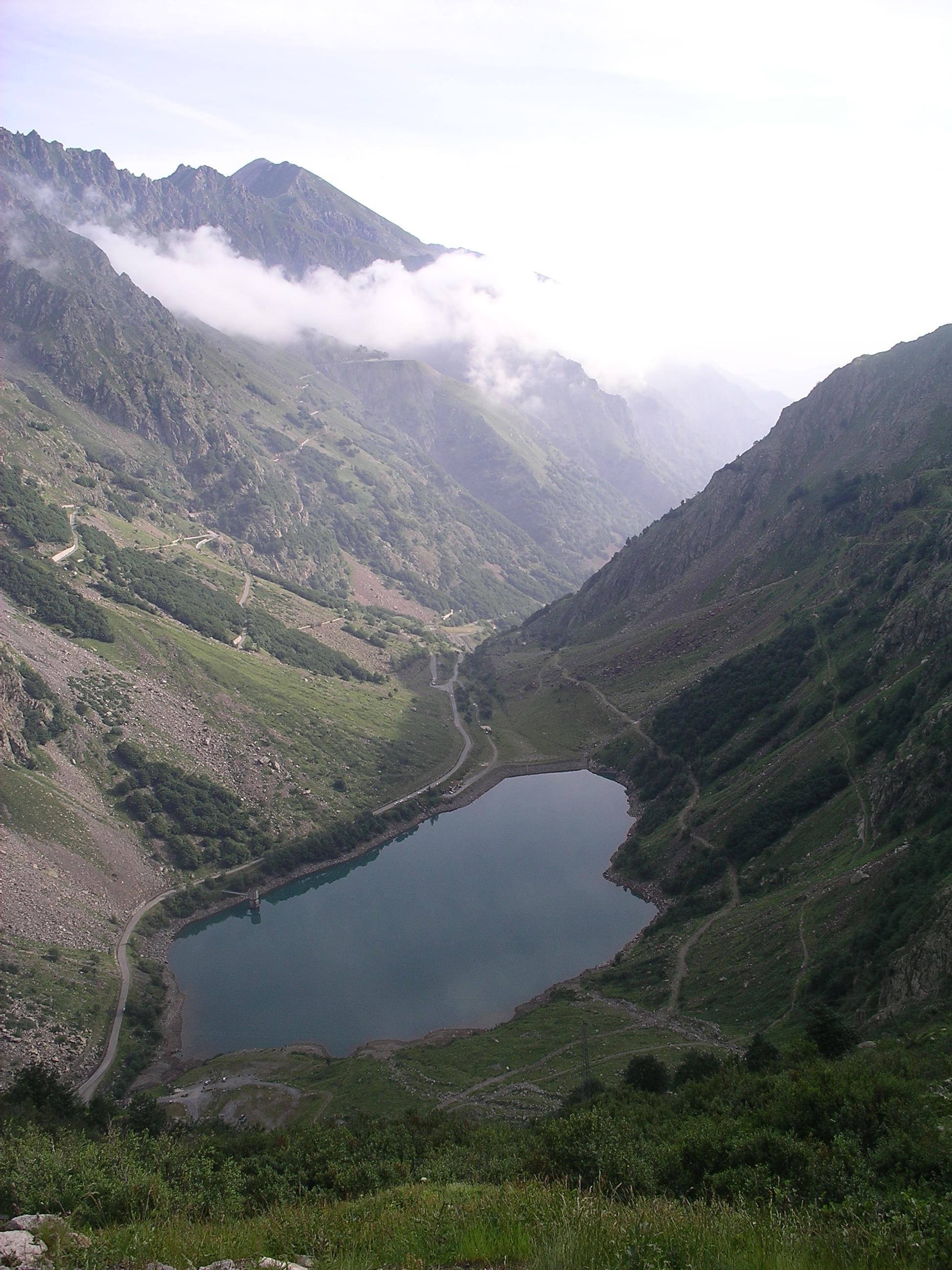
Lago della Rovina

The Rovina's upper reservoir is at an elevation of 1,535 metres (5,036 ft) and is formed by an embankment dam. It has an active capacity of 1,200,000 cubic metres (970 acre⋅ft) and depth of 10 metres (33 ft). Its catchment area is 77.2 square kilometres (29.8 sq mi). The upper Chiotas reservoir was formed with the construction of a 130-metre (430 ft) tall arch-gravity dam which lies at an elevation of 1,978 metres (6,490 ft). The dam's thickness ranges from 37.5 metres (123 ft) at the base to 5 metres (16 ft) at its crest. Its crest is 230 metres (750 ft) long and the dam has a structural volume of 360,000 cubic metres (470,000 cu yd). The Chiotas reservoir is also supported by a 30-metre (98 ft) tall and 70-metre (230 ft) long saddle dam, called Colle Laura, directly to its east. The saddle dam is also equipped with a spillway that has a discharge capacity of 240 cubic metres per second (8,500 cu ft/s). The storage capacity of the reservoir is 30,200,000 cubic metres (24,500 acre⋅ft) while 27,300,000 cubic metres (22,100 acre⋅ft) can be used for power generation. The catchment area for Chiotas is 11.6 square kilometres (4.5 sq mi) and the reservoir reaches a maximum depth of 118 metres (387 ft).

When power generation is required, water is released from either upper reservoir back down to the power station and its generators. The power station is located underground and consists of transformer, valve gallery and generator hall caverns. From the Chiotas reservoir, water is sent back through a 7.4-kilometre (4.6 mi) long tunnel and when near the power plant, it splits into a 1.7 kilometres (1.1 mi) system of penstocks which feed each of its eight 148 megawatts (198,000 hp) pump-generators. Water from the Rovina is processed by a single 133.67 megawatts (179,250 hp) generator. After the water is used for power generation, it is discharged into a 500-metre (1,600 ft) long tail-race tunnel and into Lago Della Piastra. Both the tail-race and power plant intake are protected from water hammer by surge tanks. The drop in elevation between the upper reservoirs and the power plant afford the Chiotas a maximum hydraulic head of 1,048 metres (3,438 ft) and the Rovina 598 metres (1,962 ft).

== See also ==
- Hydroelectricity in Italy
- List of pumped-storage hydroelectric power stations
