= Delio Hernández Valadés =

Mexican politician

- Born: 16 September 1956 (age 69); Colima, Mexico
- Occupation: Politician
- Political party: PT (1990–2005); PASD (2005–2009)

Delio Hernández Valadés (born 16 September 1956) is a Mexican politician formerly from the Labor Party and the Social Democratic Party. From 2006 to 2009 he served as Deputy of the LX Legislature of the Mexican Congress representing Colima.
