= Rovigo Photovoltaic Power Plant =

Italian solar power plant

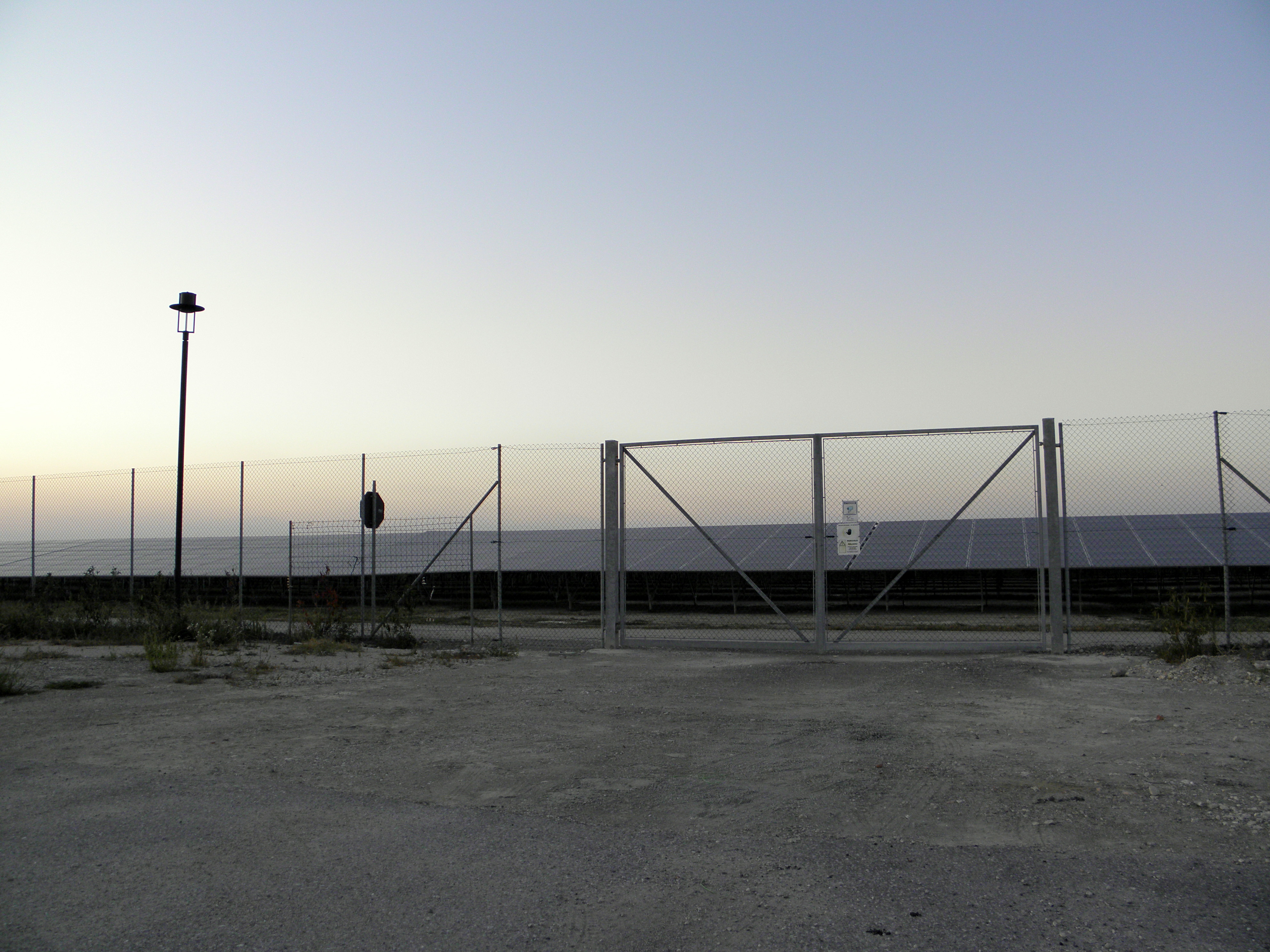
- Country: Italy
- Location: San Bellino
- Coordinates: 45°02′09″N 11°34′20″E
- Construction began: March 2010
- Commission date: November 2010
- Construction cost: US$382 million
- Owner: First Reserve Corporation
- Operator: SunEdison

Solar farm
- Type: Flat-panel PV
- Site area: 85 ha (210 acres)

Power generation
- Units operational: 280,000
- Nameplate capacity: 70.6 MW

External links
- Commons: Related media on Commons

The Rovigo Photovoltaic Power Plant is a 70 MW solar photovoltaic (PV) plant in northeast Italy, about 17 kilometres (11 mi) west of Rovigo. Construction of the plant was started in March 2010 and was completed in November 2010 at a cost of 276 million euros. When completed, it was the largest single-operating PV plant in Europe.

The project, also called the San Bellino PV power plant, was developed by SunEdison and built by Isolux Corsán. In October 2010, SunEdison sold the project to the infrastructure investor First Reserve for US$382 million and remained responsible for operating and maintaining the plant.

== See also ==
- List of photovoltaic power stations
- Montalto di Castro Photovoltaic Power Station
