= Delio Lake =

Lake in Lombardy, Italy

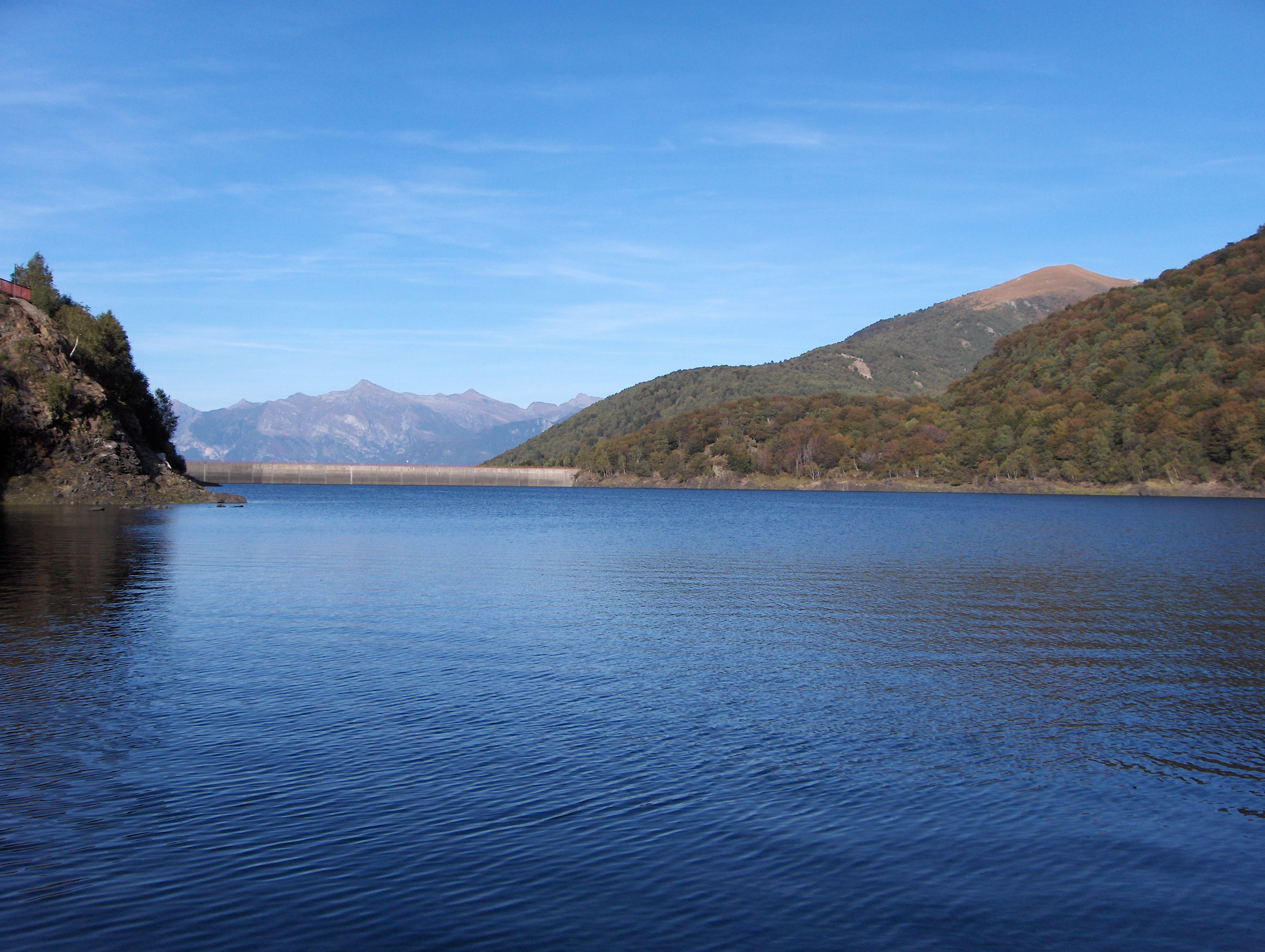

- Location within Lombardy
- Location: Province of Varese, Lombardy
- Coordinates: 46.078262°N 8.755288°E
- Basin countries: Italy
- Surface area: 30 ha (74 acres)
- Surface elevation: 930 m (3,050 ft)

Delio Lake is a lake in the Province of Varese, Lombardy, Italy. At an elevation of 930 m, its surface area is about 30 ha (74 acres). It is a natural lake, but its shape has been altered by its use for energy production. It serves as the upper reservoir for the pumped-storage Roncovalgrande Hydroelectric Plant.

In 2020 a hiker died after being caught in fast flowing water that escaped the banks of Lake Delio.
