= Lago della Rovina =

Lake in Italy

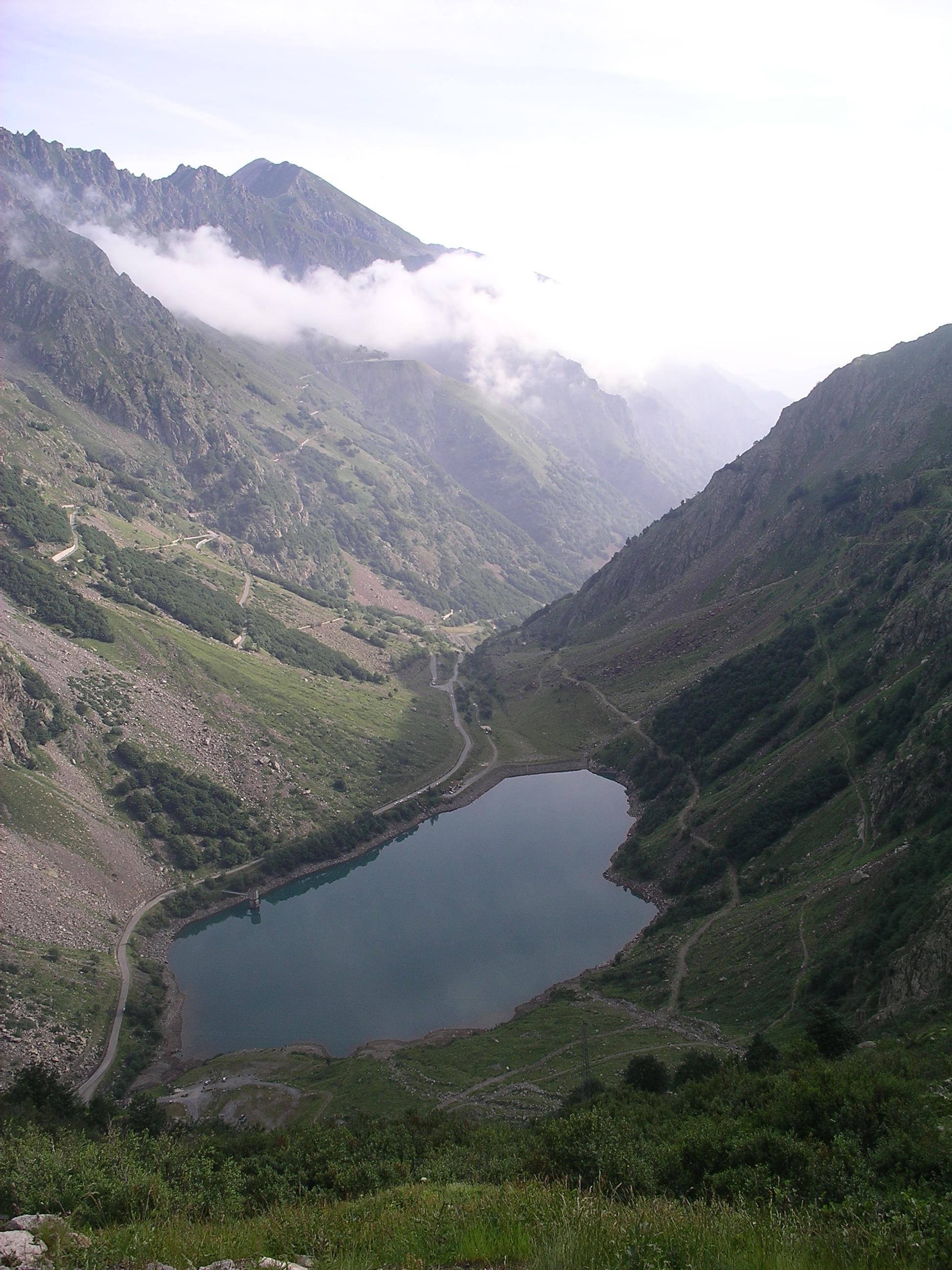

- Location within Piedmont
- Location: Province of Cuneo, Piedmont
- Coordinates: 44°10′13″N 7°19′53″E
- Basin countries: Italy
- Water volume: 1,200,000 m^{3} (970 acre⋅ft)
- Surface elevation: 1,535 m (5,036 ft)

Lago della Rovina is a lake in the Province of Cuneo, Piedmont, Italy. It is used as an upper reservoir for the pumped-storage hydroelectric Entracque Power Plant.
