= Cellino San Marco Solar Park =

- Country: Italy
- Location: Cellino San Marco
- Coordinates: 40°28′N 17°58′E
- Status: Operational
- Commission date: 2010
- Construction cost: €203 million
- Owner: AES Solar Energy

Solar farm
- Type: Flat-panel PV
- Site area: 250 acres (101.2 ha)

Power generation
- Units operational: 600,000
- Nameplate capacity: 42.692 MW
- Annual net output: 56 GWh

Cellino San Marco Solar Park is a 42.692 MW solar photovoltaic (PV) plant in Southern Italy, near Cellino San Marco using 600,000 First Solar modules.

== See also ==
- List of photovoltaic power stations
- Montalto di Castro Photovoltaic Power Station
- Solar power in Italy
