= Sant'Alberto Solar Park =

Photovoltaic power plant in Emilia-Romagna, Italy

- Official name: Parco Fotovoltaico Sant'Alberto
- Country: Italy
- Location: Sant'Alberto
- Coordinates: 44°31′N 12°09′E
- Status: Operational
- Commission date: 2010
- Construction cost: €80 million

Solar farm
- Type: Flat-panel PV
- Site area: 71 hectares (175 acres)

Power generation
- Nameplate capacity: 34.63 MW
- Annual net output: 42 MW⋅h (150 GJ)

Sant'Alberto Solar Park is a 34.63 MW photovoltaic power plant in Emilia-Romagna, Italy, which has been combined with a sheep dairy farm, as a clean energy project.

The Sant'Alberto Solar Park is one of the largest photovoltaic plants in Italy. It is one of the largest in installed capacity and size, and the first to be designed in an integrated manner to an extensive breeding of sheep. The method is called "pratopascolo photovoltaic" because it enhances the local environmental context. The park has been prepared in an area for the management and care of the pasture with the presence of local milking and milk-processing, with manger, for dairy products. The plant consists of crystalline silicon photovoltaic modules.

On the property are 1000 to 1400 sheep, which produce about 180 thousand litres (48 thousand US gal) of milk, which has been made into cheese.

== See also ==
- List of photovoltaic power stations
- Solar power in Italy
