= Michelle Delio =

American journalist

Michelle Delio is an American freelance writer whose articles have appeared in Wired News, InfoWorld, and the MIT Technology Review. She has also written under her maiden name "Michelle Finley".

In 2005, it was alleged that Delio had made up 'color quotes' for some of her articles. The incident began when Delio published an article at MIT Technology Review based on an interview with 'G.S', an anonymous insider at Hewlett-Packard who claimed the existence of a misogynistic attitude at the company towards then-CEO Carly Fiorina and female staff in general.

After Hewlett-Packard challenged the author's sources, MIT Technology Review retracted the article. Wired News conducted an internal study, which determined that a number of Delio's 'secondary' sources (i.e., those added for color or supporting quotes) were unverifiable, but that her 'primary' sources (i.e., those most essential to her stories) were legitimate. Of 160 stories reviewed, 24 had problems with at least one source, although no evidence was forthcoming to suggest the main substance of the articles was skewed. Wired News amended 24 of Delio's articles, while MIT Technology Review retracted 10 completely.
