= Province of Aosta =

Province in Italy

Province of Aosta Provincia di Aosta (Italian) Province d'Aoste (French)
- Province of the Kingdom of Italy
- 1927–1945
- Flag Coat of arms

- Map of the Province of Aosta
- Capital: Aosta
- History
  - Established: 2 January 1927
  - Disestablished: 31 December 1945
- Today part of: Aosta Valley; Province of Turin

The Province of Aosta (Italian: Provincia di Aosta; French: Province d'Aoste) was a province of the Kingdom of Italy, officially from 1927 to 1945. It preceded the formation of the Autonomous Region of Aosta Valley, established in 1948.

== History ==
The Province of Aosta was established by Royal Decree No. 1 of 2 January 1927, incorporating the municipalities of the former districts of Aosta and Ivrea, previously part of the Province of Turin.

Created under Fascist rule, the province never had an elected provincial council. Its administration was divided between the prefect, representing the central government, and the president of the province (preside della provincia), who headed the provincial administration. During the Italian Social Republic, this arrangement was replaced by the office of Head of the Province (Capo della Provincia), which combined the two functions.

In 1945, the province came under French military occupation amid French annexationist claims. The Italian government subsequently abolished the Province of Aosta through Legislative Decree No. 545 of 7 September 1945, establishing instead the Autonomous District of the Aosta Valley, comprising the territory of the historic Duchy of Aosta and its 73 traditional municipalities. The city of Ivrea and the Canavese area were returned to the Province of Turin. The prefecture's functions in Aosta were transferred to the president of the district. The measure took effect after the end of the AMGOT occupation and the restoration of full Italian sovereignty on 31 December 1945.

It became the Autonomous Region of Aosta Valley, with special statutory status, in 1948.

== Government ==
=== List of presidents ===
No.	Name	Term of office		Party
No.	Name	Start	End	Party
1	Andrea Pellerino	1929	1935	PNF
2	Domenico Giacchetti	1936	1939	PNF
3	Gabriele Michelini di San Martino	1939	28 March 1944	PNF; PFR
–	Corrado Aldaresi (prefectural commissioner)	28 March 1944	December 1944	PFR
–	Italo Granato (prefectural commissioner)	December 1944	1945	PFR

== Sources ==
- Omezzoli, Tullio (1999). Prefetti e fascismo nella provincia d'Aosta, 1926–1945. Arvier: Le Château.
- Riccarand, Elio (2000). Storia della Valle d'Aosta contemporanea (1919–1945). Aosta: Stylos.
- Zanotto, André (1980). Histoire de la Vallée d'Aoste. Quart: Musumeci.
