= Montalto di Castro Photovoltaic Power Station =

Photovoltaic power station in Italy

Montalto di Castro
- Country: Italy
- Location: Montalto di Castro
- Coordinates: 42°22′33″N 11°35′41″E
- Status: Operational
- Commission date: November 2009, December 2010

Solar farm
- Type: Flat-panel PV
- Site area: 166 ha (1.7 km^{2})

Power generation
- Units operational: 276,156
- Nameplate capacity: 84.23 MW_{p}
- Capacity factor: 19%
- Annual net output: 140 GWh

The Montalto di Castro photovoltaic power station is an 84 megawatt (MW) photovoltaic power station at Montalto di Castro in Viterbo province, Italy. The project was developed by the independent developer SunRay that was later acquired by SunPower. The park is the largest PV project in Italy, and among the largest in Europe.

The project was built in several phases. The first phase with a total capacity of 24 MW_{AC} was connected in late 2009. It uses SunPower solar panels as well as its tracker systems. The second phase (8 MW) was commissioned in 2010, and the third and fourth phases, totaling 44 MW_{AC}, were completed in December 2010, totaling 276,156 solar modules with 305 watt each.

In December 2010 SunPower has completed the sale of Montalto di Castro solar park to a consortium of international investors. SunPower designed and built the solar power plant and will provide ongoing operations and maintenance services for the new owners.

== See also ==
- Cellino San Marco Solar Park
- List of photovoltaic power stations
- Photovoltaic power station
- Solar power in Italy
